= National Register of Historic Places listings in Yakima County, Washington =

Location of Yakima County in Washington

This is a list of the National Register of Historic Places listings in Yakima County, Washington.

This is intended to be a complete list of the properties and districts on the National Register of Historic Places in Yakima County, Washington, United States. Latitude and longitude coordinates are provided for many National Register properties and districts; these locations may be seen together in an online map.

There are 72 properties and districts listed on the National Register in the county. Another property was once listed but has been removed.

This National Park Service list is complete through NPS recent listings posted August 21, 2026.

== Current listings ==
	Name on the Register	Image	Date listed	Location	City or town	Description
1	E. William Brackett House	E. William Brackett House	October 25, 1990 (#90001605)	2606 Tieton Dr. 46°35′34″N 120°32′35″W	Yakima	
2	Brooker-Taylor House	Brooker-Taylor House	February 18, 1987 (#87000061)	203 S. Naches Ave. 46°36′03″N 120°29′49″W	Yakima	This house no longer exists, it burned between 2012 and 2014 (exact date unknown). A modern dwelling was constructed in its place in 2016.
3	Buckeye Ranch House	Buckeye Ranch House	November 2, 1990 (#90001735)	10881 WA 410; 46°47′55″N 120°53′19″W	Naches	
4	Bumping Lake Cabin No. 16	Bumping Lake Cabin No. 16	January 23, 2013 (#12001223)	1920 Bumping Lake Road; 46°51′27″N 121°19′02″W	Naches vicinity	
5	Bumping Lake Resort	Bumping Lake Resort	August 28, 2013 (#13000211)	781 Bumping Lake Rd. 46°52′36″N 121°18′10″W	Naches vicinity	
6	Capitol Theatre	Capitol Theatre	April 11, 1973 (#73001895)	19 S. 3rd St. 46°36′09″N 120°30′08″W	Yakima	
7	Carbonneau Mansion	Carbonneau Mansion	December 12, 1976 (#76001927)	620 S. 48th Ave. 46°35′29″N 120°34′22″W	Yakima	
8	Rupert Card House	Rupert Card House	February 18, 1987 (#87000063)	1105 W. A St. 46°35′59″N 120°31′27″W	Yakima	
9	Elizabeth Loudon Carmichael House	Elizabeth Loudon Carmichael House	May 1, 1991 (#91000538)	108 W. Pine St. 46°33′06″N 120°28′34″W	Union Gap	
10	Carmichael-Loudon House	Carmichael-Loudon House	February 18, 1987 (#87000065)	2 Chicago Ave. 46°35′51″N 120°31′36″W	Yakima	
11	Cornell Farmstead	Cornell Farmstead	February 17, 1987 (#87000055)	Pleasant Rd. and Old Prosser Rd. 46°14′35″N 119°53′41″W	Grandview	
12	Harrison Dills House	Harrison Dills House	February 18, 1987 (#87000066)	4 N. Sixteenth Ave. 46°35′51″N 120°31′47″W	Yakima	
13	Donald House	Donald House	December 12, 1976 (#76001928)	304 N. 2nd St. 46°36′24″N 120°30′21″W	Yakima	
14	Donald-Wapato Bridge	Donald-Wapato Bridge	May 24, 1995 (#95000629)	Donald Rd. over the Yakima R. 46°27′58″N 120°23′51″W	Wapato	Bridges of Washington State MPS. Replace in 2004. Picture is new bridge.
15	Edgar Rock Lodge	Edgar Rock Lodge	August 1, 1996 (#96000843)	380 Old Naches Rd. 46°55′16″N 121°03′03″W	Naches	
16	First Baptist Church	First Baptist Church	April 5, 2016 (#16000147)	515 East Yakima Ave. 46°36′15″N 120°29′56″W	Yakima	
17	Fort Simcoe State Park	Fort Simcoe State Park	June 27, 1974 (#74001994)	Southwest of Yakima on WA 220; 46°20′34″N 120°50′08″W	Yakima	
18	Fruit and Produce Row Historic District	Fruit and Produce Row Historic District	January 4, 2024 (#100009696)	Both sides of North First Ave, from West Yakima Ave north to West D St; 46°36′14″N 120°30′39″W	Yakima	
19	O. J. Gendron Ranch	O. J. Gendron Ranch	September 21, 2005 (#05001062)	6702 Bell Rd. 46°33′34″N 120°24′57″W	Moxee City	
20	H. M. Gilbert House	H. M. Gilbert House	August 23, 1985 (#85001812)	2109 W. Yakima Ave. 46°35′51″N 120°32′11″W	Yakima	
21	James Gleed Barn	James Gleed Barn	May 10, 1990 (#90000672)	1960 Old Naches Hwy. 46°39′42″N 120°36′13″W	Naches	
22	Daniel Goodman House	Daniel Goodman House	October 2, 1992 (#92001286)	701 S. 3rd Ave. 46°35′28″N 120°30′28″W	Yakima	
23	Gotchen Creek Ranger Station	Gotchen Creek Ranger Station	April 25, 2007 (#07000369)	Forest Service Road 8225.060; 46°05′23″N 121°29′04″W	Gifford Pinchot National Forest	
24	Grandview Herald Building	Grandview Herald Building	February 17, 1987 (#87000056)	107 Division St. 46°15′21″N 119°54′01″W	Grandview	
25	Grandview High School	Grandview High School	February 17, 1987 (#87000058)	913 W. Second St. 46°15′18″N 119°54′54″W	Grandview	
26	Grandview Road-Yellowstone Trail	Grandview Road-Yellowstone Trail	December 11, 1995 (#95001446)	Grandview Pavement Rd. between Mabton-Sunnyside Rd. and Apple Way; 46°15′01″N 119°59′50″W	Grandview	
27	Grandview State Bank	Grandview State Bank	February 17, 1987 (#87000060)	100 W. Second St. 46°15′17″N 119°54′04″W	Grandview	
28	Grave of the Legendary Giantess	Grave of the Legendary Giantess	December 14, 1978 (#78002789)	Address Restricted	Toppenish	Not an actual grave, but a rock formation some think looks to have the outline of a woman.
29	James Greene House	James Greene House	May 6, 1987 (#87000059)	203 N. Ninth St. 46°36′32″N 120°29′37″W	Yakima	
30	A. E. Howard House	A. E. Howard House	February 18, 1987 (#87000067)	602 N. First St. 46°36′36″N 120°30′32″W	Yakima	
31	Howay-Dykstra House	Howay-Dykstra House	February 17, 1987 (#87000062)	114 Birch St. 46°15′19″N 119°53′53″W	Grandview	
32	William N. Irish House	William N. Irish House	March 31, 1992 (#92000280)	210 S. 28th Ave. 46°35′48″N 120°32′43″W	Yakima	
33	Kamiakin's Gardens	Kamiakin's Gardens	December 22, 1976 (#76001926)	West of Union Gap on Lower Ahtanum Rd. 46°31′46″N 120°49′32″W	Union Gap	
34	James Knuppenburg House	James Knuppenburg House	February 18, 1987 (#87000070)	111 S. Ninth St. 46°36′10″N 120°29′30″W	Yakima	
35	LaFramboise Farmstead	LaFramboise Farmstead	February 28, 1985 (#85000400)	5204 Mieras Rd. 46°34′37″N 120°25′44″W	Yakima	
36	A. E. Larson Building	A. E. Larson Building	September 11, 1984 (#84003647)	6 S. 2nd St. 46°36′08″N 120°30′13″W	Yakima	
37	Larson-Hellieson House	Larson-Hellieson House	May 6, 1987 (#87000073)	208 N. Naches Ave. 46°36′25″N 120°30′03″W	Yakima	Demolished
38	William Lindsey House	William Lindsey House	February 18, 1987 (#87000075)	301 N. Eighth St. 46°36′32″N 120°29′44″W	Yakima	
39	Lund Building	Lund Building	October 13, 1983 (#83004276)	5 N. Front St. 46°36′08″N 120°30′23″W	Yakima	
40	Mabton High School	Mabton High School	November 21, 1985 (#85002917)	High School Rd. 46°12′44″N 119°59′25″W	Mabton	
41	Masonic Temple	Masonic Temple	February 16, 1996 (#96000051)	321 E. Yakima Ave. 46°36′13″N 120°30′02″W	Yakima	Also known as the Great Western Building.
42	Mattoon Cabin	Mattoon Cabin	October 28, 1977 (#77001371)	South of Sawyer on U.S. 12; 46°27′07″N 120°21′23″W	Sawyer	
43	Alexander McAllister House	Alexander McAllister House	October 25, 1990 (#90001603)	402 W. White St. 46°32′59″N 120°28′47″W	Union Gap	
44	Alexander Miller House		February 18, 1987 (#87000076)	314 N. Second St. 46°36′26″N 120°30′27″W	Yakima	
45	John J. Miller House	John J. Miller House	February 18, 1987 (#87000078)	9 S. Tenth Ave. 46°35′52″N 120°31′16″W	Yakima	
46	Francis Mineau House	Francis Mineau House	February 18, 1987 (#87000079)	216 N. Seventh St. 46°36′28″N 120°29′51″W	Yakima	
47	Edward B. Moore House	Edward B. Moore House	February 18, 1987 (#87000081)	222 N. Second St. 46°35′49″N 120°30′20″W	Yakima	
48	Morse House	Morse House	February 17, 1987 (#87000064)	404 E. Main St. 46°15′22″N 119°53′46″W	Grandview	
49	Old North Yakima Historic District	Old North Yakima Historic District	May 2, 1986 (#86000960)	Roughly bounded by E. A St., S. First St., E. Yakima Ave., and the Northern Pacific RR tracks 46°36′10″N 120°30′24″W	Yakima	
50	Winfield Perrin House	Winfield Perrin House	February 18, 1987 (#87000083)	12 S. Eleventh Ave. 46°35′50″N 120°31′27″W	Yakima	
51	H. W. Potter House	H. W. Potter House	February 18, 1987 (#87000084)	305 S. Fourth St. 46°35′56″N 120°29′52″W	Yakima	No longer extant. New house built in 2019.
52	Powell House	Powell House	February 18, 1987 (#87000085)	207 S. Ninth St. 46°36′07″N 120°29′30″W	Yakima	
53	James Richey House	James Richey House	May 6, 1987 (#87000087)	206 N. Naches Ave. 46°36′23″N 120°30′01″W	Yakima	Demolished
54	Rosedell	Rosedell	July 12, 1990 (#90001074)	1811 W. Yakima Ave. 46°35′52″N 120°31′57″W	Yakima	
55	W. P. Sawyer House And Orchard	W. P. Sawyer House And Orchard	November 23, 1977 (#77001370)	U.S. 12; 46°27′14″N 120°21′22″W	Sawyer	
56	James Sharp House	James Sharp House	February 18, 1987 (#87000088)	111 N. Ninth St. 46°36′26″N 120°29′36″W	Yakima	
57	St. Joseph's Mission	St. Joseph's Mission	December 22, 1976 (#76001925)	East of Tampico on Tampico Rd. 46°31′54″N 120°45′30″W	Tampico	
58	Reuben Sweet House	Reuben Sweet House	February 18, 1987 (#87000089)	6 Chicago Ave. 46°35′52″N 120°31′36″W	Yakima	
59	Teapot Dome Service Station	Teapot Dome Service Station	August 29, 1985 (#85001943)	Old State HW 12; 46°23′16″N 120°14′02″W	Zillah	
60	Toppenish-Zillah Bridge	Toppenish-Zillah Bridge	May 24, 1995 (#95000630)	Over the Yakima R., between Toppenish and Zillah; 46°23′59″N 120°16′49″W	Toppenish	Bridges of Washington State MPS. Replaced after 2016 washout.
61	U.S. Post Office and Courthouse	U.S. Post Office and Courthouse	November 27, 1979 (#79002568)	25 S. 3rd St; 46°36′07″N 120°30′08″W	Yakima	
62	Union Pacific Freight Building	Union Pacific Freight Building	September 8, 1988 (#88001519)	104 W. Yakima Ave. 46°36′04″N 120°30′32″W	Yakima	
63	US Post Office-Sunnyside Main	US Post Office-Sunnyside Main	May 30, 1991 (#91000656)	713 E. Edison Ave. 46°19′25″N 120°00′36″W	Sunnyside	
64	US Post Office-Toppenish Main	US Post Office-Toppenish Main	August 7, 1991 (#91000658)	14 Jefferson Ave. 46°22′32″N 120°18′44″W	Toppenish	
65	William Watt House	William Watt House	February 18, 1987 (#87000091)	1511 W. Chestnut Ave. 46°35′47″N 120°31′44″W	Yakima	
66	Dr. Edmond West House	Dr. Edmond West House	February 18, 1987 (#87000092)	202 S. Sixteenth Ave. 46°35′46″N 120°31′46″W	Yakima	
67	Charles Wilcox House	Charles Wilcox House	February 18, 1987 (#87000093)	220 N. Sixteenth Ave. 46°36′05″N 120°31′47″W	Yakima	
68	Yakima Indian Agency Building	Yakima Indian Agency Building	May 19, 1988 (#88000605)	1 S. Elm; 46°22′44″N 120°18′55″W	Toppenish	
69	Yakima Valley Filipino Community Hall	Yakima Valley Filipino Community Hall	December 21, 2023 (#100009632)	211 W 2nd Street; 46°26′49″N 120°25′18″W	Wapato	
70	Yakima Valley Transportation Company	Yakima Valley Transportation Company	October 8, 1992 (#84004012)	Third Ave. and Pine St. 46°35′56″N 120°36′09″W	Yakima	
71	Fred and Elizabeth Young House	Fred and Elizabeth Young House	April 1, 2011 (#11000150)	804 S. 22nd Ave. 46°35′22″N 120°32′19″W	Yakima	
72	Young Women's Christian Association Building	Young Women's Christian Association Building	April 29, 1993 (#93000361)	15 N. Naches Ave. 46°36′17″N 120°30′00″W	Yakima	

== Former listings ==
	Name on the Register	Image	Date listed	Date removed	Location	City or town	Description
1	C. M. Holtzinger Fruit Company Building		September 8, 1988 (#88001517)	July 16, 1990	N. Second Ave. and W. Yakima Ave. 46°36′18″N 120°29′57″W	Yakima	Destroyed by fire on May 1, 1990.

== See also ==
- List of National Historic Landmarks in Washington (state)
- National Register of Historic Places listings in Washington state
