= Ahtanum =

Ahtanum may refer to the following places in Yakima County, Washington, United States:

- Ahtanum, Washington, a census-designated place
- Ahtanum Creek, a tributary of the Yakima River
- Ahtanum Ridge, an anticline ridge south of Yakima
- Ahtanum State Forest, a working forest and recreation area
- Ahtanum View Corrections Center, a former minimum-security prison in Yakima
