= Ahtanum Creek =

Stream in Yakima County, Washington, United States

- Location of the mouth of Ahtanum Creek in Washington Ahtanum Creek (the United States)

Location
- Country: United States
- State: Washington
- Region: Yakima County
- Cities: Union Gap, Ahtanum & Tampico

Physical characteristics
- Source
  - location: Near Tampico, Yakima County, Washington, United States
  - coordinates: 46°31′23″N 120°51′15″W
  - elevation: 2,027 ft (618 m)
- Mouth: Yakima River
  - location: Union Gap, Yakima County, Washington, United States
  - coordinates: 46°31′51″N 120°28′23″W
  - elevation: 950 ft (290 m)
- Basin size: 173 sq mi (450 km^{2})
- Discharge
  - location: Union Gap
  - average: 76.5 cu ft/s (2.17 m^{3}/s)
  - minimum: 3.5 cu ft/s (0.099 m^{3}/s)
  - maximum: 3,100 cu ft/s (88 m^{3}/s)

Ahtanum Creek is a tributary of the Yakima River in the U.S. state of Washington. It starts at the confluence of the Middle and North Forks of Ahtanum Creek near Tampico, flows along the north base of Ahtanum Ridge, ends at the Yakima River near Union Gap and forms a portion of the northern boundary of the Yakama Indian Reservation. The name Ahtanum originates from the Sahaptin language, which was spoken by Native Americans in the region.

The North Fork enters the Middle Fork just upstream from its confluence with the South Fork. These three forks have sources in the Cascade Mountains. The creek has had several different official names since Europeans settled the region, all of which have been variant spellings of Ahtanum. The current spelling has been in place since 1916. Seasonal flooding associated with snow melting in the spring is common.

== History ==
Native Americans, including the Yakama Tribe inhabited the region surrounding Ahtanum Creek long before the arrival of Europeans. The band living along the creek, known as Ahtanumlema (″People of the water by the long hill″), were considered to be one of the more important groups within the tribe.

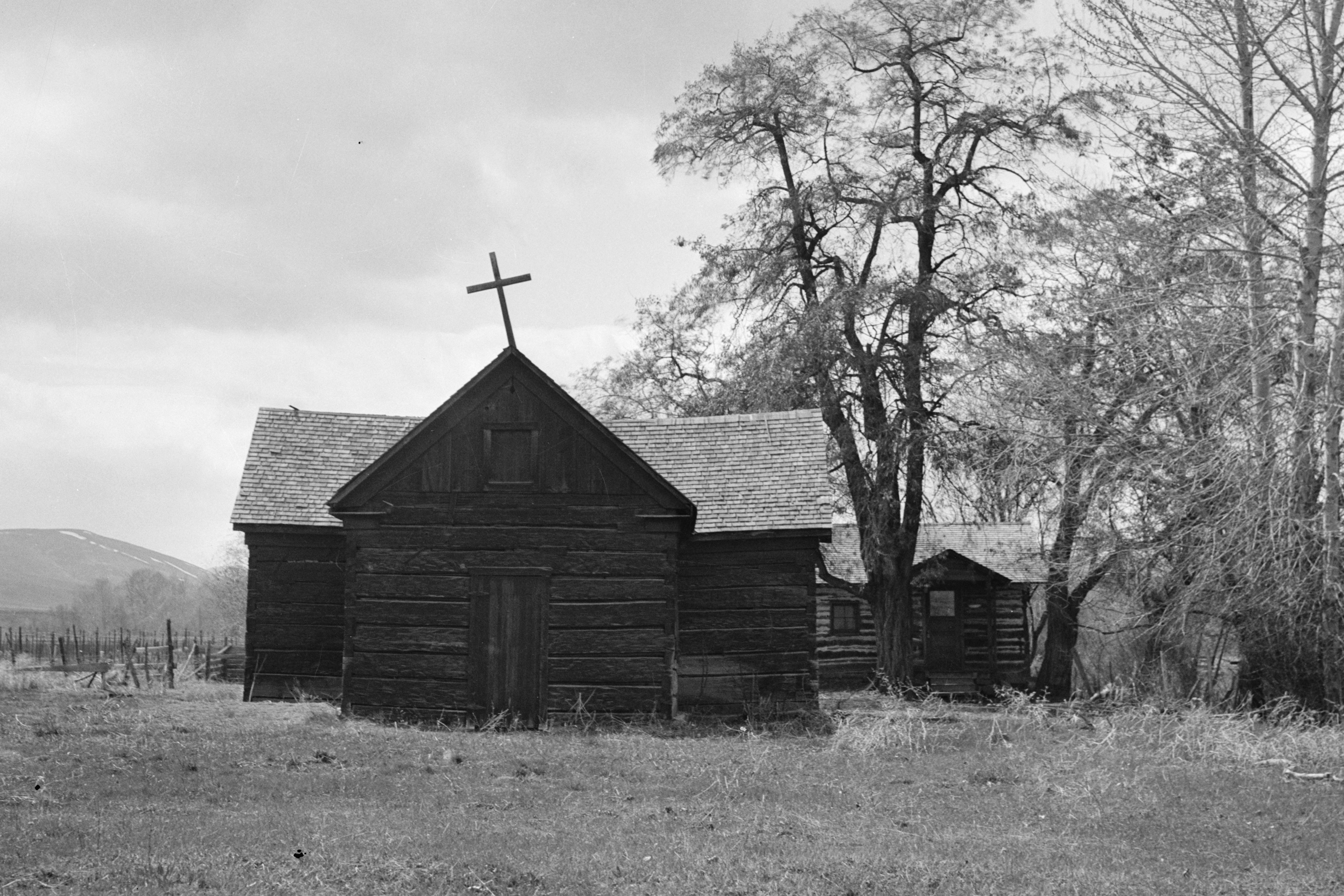
St. Joseph's Mission.

While the creek still lay within Oregon Territory, Catholic Fathers Louis D'herbomez and Charles Pandosy were sent to the area by François Norbert Blanchet, who was Bishop of the Archdiocese of Oregon City at the request of native leaders. Father Pandosy first served in missions near Richland and Ellensburg before constructing St. Joseph's Mission in 1852 with Father D'herbomez along Ahtanum Creek near what is now Tampico. This location was chosen because of its location within the main summer camp of Chief Kamiakin.

The missionaries and Yakamas worked together to build the first irrigation canals in the area. The relationship between the two groups was such that Kamiakin and others brought their children to the mission to be baptized. In 1854, Father D'herbomez was replaced by Father Pierre-Paul Durieu who would compile a dictionary of the Sahaptin language. The original mission was burned down in 1855 during the Yakima War by U.S. soldiers who believed the missionaries were conspiring with the Yakama Tribe. The mission was rebuilt in 1867.

Union Gap was established as Yakima City along Ahtanum Creek near its confluence with the Yakima River in the 1860s and became the county seat in 1870. In 1885, the Northern Pacific Railway established North Yakima (which later became Yakima) four miles north of present-day Union Gap because the railroad considered the then-current settlement to be too swampy and too close to nearby ridges. North Yakima was incorporated and became the county seat in 1886.

A wildfire burned 300 acres (1.2 km^{2}) near the North Fork of Ahtanum Creek in 2009.

== Human use ==
Water is pulled from Ahtanum Creek to irrigate 9,000 acres (36 km^{2}) of land upstream of the gauge in Union Gap. Fishing is popular along the creek, with fly fishing, baitcasting, spinning all being successful. The upper portion of the creek's watershed lies within Ahtanum State Forest, which is managed by the Washington State Department of Natural Resources. The forest has an area of 75,000 acres (300 km^{2}) that has numerous campgrounds. Seasonal hunting and snowmobiling are also popular.

== Ecology ==
Being located in the rain shadow of the Cascade Range, Ahtanum Creek has a riparian zone that serves as an important habitat for animals living in the region. Endangered species that utilize the creek include steelhead trout, bull trout, Chinook salmon, and coho salmon.

The Yakama Tribe completed a restoration project at La Salle High School. This project included strengthening three areas of the creek bank that were prone to erosion and reintroducing native plant species such as coyote willow. Along with this, two backwater channels were created and 8,500 cubic yards (6,500 m^{3}) of soil were removed from the flood plain. These changes reconnected that stretch of the creek with its flood plain and provided areas for young fish to be reared. The North Yakima Conservation District installed fish screens on five water diversions between 2002 and 2006.

== See also ==
- Kamiakin's Gardens
- St. Joseph's Mission
