= Compass High School =

Compass High School may refer to:

- Compass High School (Grandview, Washington)
- Compass High School (San Mateo, California)
- Compass High School (Tucson, Arizona)
