= Grandview High School (Washington) =

Location
- 1601 W 5th Street; Grandview, Washington 98930; United States
- Coordinates: 46°15′8.67″N 119°55′25.39″W

Information
- Type: Public High School
- School district: Grandview School District
- Principal: Derek Anderson
- Teaching staff: 50.50 (FTE)
- Grades: 9-12
- Enrollment: 1,168 (2023-2024)
- Student to teacher ratio: 23.13
- Color(s)
- Mascot: Greyhound
- Nickname: Grandview Greyhounds
- Website: www.gsd200.org/Domain/8

Grandview High School is a public high school serving 804 students in grades 9-12 located in Grandview, Washington, United States. The athletic team name is the Greyhounds. The current principal is Derek Anderson.

== Notable alumni ==
- Gloria Mendoza, Republican member of the Washington House of Representatives
