= La Salle High School (Union Gap, Washington) =

Location
- 3000 Lightning Way Union Gap (Yakima County), Washington 98903; United States; 46°33′0″N 120°29′44″W

Information
- Type: Private, Catholic, Coeducational Secondary education institution
- Motto: Latin: Signum Fidei; English: Sign of Faith
- Religious affiliations: Roman Catholic, (De La Salle Brothers): [also known as "Lasallian Christian Brothers"; NOT to be confused with the Congregation of Christian Brothers]
- Patron saint: Saint Jean-Baptiste de La Salle
- Established: 1998; 28 years ago
- Founder: Institute of the Brothers of the Christian Schools
- School board: Board of Trustees
- President: Ted Kanelopoulos
- Dean: Olivia Hart (Vice Principal of Academics); Emily Heaverlo (Vice Principal of Student Life); Ryan Brewer (Dean of Students (as of 2022))
- Director: Lisa Kanelopoulos (Admissions Director); Don Erickson (Athletic Director); Emily Heaverlo (Director of Campus Ministry)
- Principal: Ted Kanelopoulos
- Chaplain: Father Edgar Quiroga
- Staff: 32
- Grades: 9–12
- Enrollment: 220
- Colors: Blue and Silver
- Slogan: Enter to learn; leave to serve.
- Athletics conference: SCAC
Sports
Football Volleyball Basketball Baseball Softball	Soccer; Cross Country Golf; Tennis; Track and Field
- Mascot: Lightning
- Team name: Lightning
- Accreditation: OSPI, WCEA, NAC
- Communities served: Yakima County, Washington
- Affiliation: WCEA; NCEA; NHS; WIAA
- Website: www.lasalleyakima.com

La Salle High School is a private, Roman Catholic high school in Union Gap, Washington. It is the only Catholic high school in the Roman Catholic Diocese of Yakima. The school's motto, Signum Fidei (Sign of Faith), is shared with other Lasallian schools around the world.

== Background ==
La Salle High School of Yakima is a Catholic Lasallian college-preparatory high school. The school's pedagogy is based on the teachings of St. John Baptist de La Salle, who founded the first Lasallian school in Reims, France in 1685.

La Salle High School was opened in 1998 to replace Carroll High School, which had closed in the late 1980s. The school is sponsored and administered by the De La Salle Christian Brothers. It is also a member of the Brothers' District of San Francisco New Orleans, headquartered at Mont La Salle in Napa, California. A group of committed Catholic parents and then-Bishop of Yakima, Cardinal Francis George, worked to found the high school.

== Academics ==
All students at La Salle take a college preparatory course of studies. La Salle High School partners with the University of Washington, Central Washington University, Eastern Washington University, and Grand Canyon University to offer dual enrollment courses in several academic departments. Additionally, a number of AP and Honors courses are offered. Students earn SAT and ACT scores above the national average. The class of 2017 numbered 61 and received scholarship and aid offers totaling 5.5 million dollars.

== Faith ==
La Salle is a Catholic High School in the Lasallian tradition. The association of Lasallian schools is in more than 80 countries, with one million students enrolled. Students at Lasallian schools gather regularly for prayer and Mass (liturgy of Catholicism), and are encouraged to participate in campus ministry activities. All students participate in the four-year religious studies curriculum. Lasallian educational institutions are mandated to be of service of those in need in the community. For Lasallians, this is an expression of their values.

Students at La Salle High School may participate in weekly service projects to those in need in the area. Four service "immersion trips" are offered annually, which expand service-giving opportunities and provide social justice issues education to students. These trips include: serving homeless people in Seattle; working with children on the Blackfeet Indian Reservation in Montana; serving the urban poor of Rochester, New York; assisting impoverished residents of the Yakama Nation who are in need of home repair and improvement; and, in summer, to Mexico, to serve marginalized children there.

== Athletics ==
Since the school was founded in 1998, La Salle has won four team State Championships and many tennis, golf, and track individual State Championships. Home to the La Salle Lightning, the school offers cheer, football, soccer, volleyball, cross country, basketball, track, tennis, golf, baseball, boys soccer, and softball teams. In 2010 La Salle opted up to the 1A classification and currently competes in the South Central Athletic Conference (SCAC) athletic league.

In the 2018–2019 school year, La Salle won both the 1A Girls' Soccer State Championship and the 1A Girls' Basketball State Championship.

== Campus ==
La Salle has been developing its master plan since moving to the Union Gap campus in 2000. The academic buildings include Roy Hall, Lightning Hall, the Gamache Science Center and several temporary classrooms where future buildings will be built. At the center of campus is the Gamache Chapel of Saint John Baptist de La Salle. On the back of a chapel is a stage which opens up to a large outdoor amphitheater which holds many of the school's celebrations including graduation. The forty acre campus includes a soccer, baseball, fastpitch, practice football field and large gymnasium, as well as a number of tennis courts and a weight lifting facility. On far end of campus near the Ahtanum Creek, La Salle has built a full service fish hatchery in cooperation with the Yakama Nation. The hatchery is completely managed by La Salle students and teachers and is helping to re-establish important salmon runs on this area of the watershed. Nearby the hatchery students operate beehives that produce Lightning Honey each year and serve as a resource for scientific study.

Recently, the school completed construction of its weights and exercise facility, with plans for additional buildings in the works, including an administration building, a classroom building, a visual and performing arts center, a media tech center, and a football stadium.
