= Compass High School (Grandview, Washington) =

- Grandview High School
- U.S. National Register of Historic Places
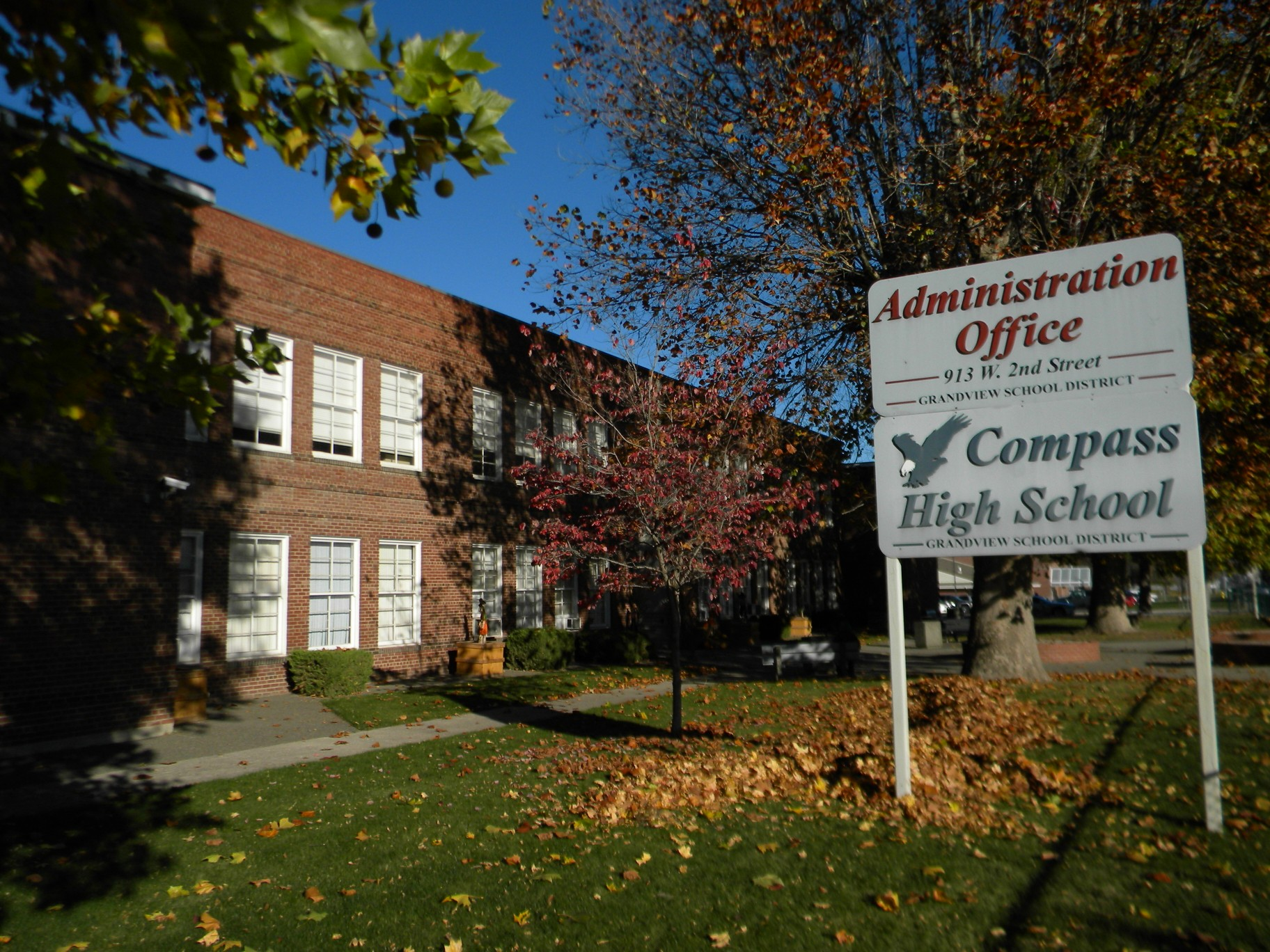

- Location within Washington (state) Location within the United States
- Location: 913 W. Second St., Grandview, Washington
- Coordinates: 46°15′17.55″N 119°54′53.85″W
- Area: 5.1 acres (2.1 ha)
- Built: 1937
- Architect: John W. Maloney
- Architectural style: Moderne
- MPS: Grandview MRA
- NRHP reference No.: 87000058
- Added to NRHP: February 17, 1987

Compass High School is the former Grandview High School in Grandview, Washington, built in the moderne style in 1937 using Works Progress Administration funding. The school was designed by Yakima architect John W. Maloney.

The school is two stories along the street elevation, with a flat-roofed brick facade accented by horizontal recessed brick courses. The main entry is a recessed by extending to the line of the second floor window heads, ornamented with six small relief sculptures above in the brickwork. Glass block lines the inset bay. An arched gymnasium extends to the rear.

Grandview High School has since relocated to a newer facility three blocks away. The former Grandview High School is now Compass High School, an alternative school established in 1994. The old school was listed on the National Register of Historic Places on February 17, 1987.
