= List of Washington state forests =

Washington contains 11 state forests. These sites are managed by the Department of Natural Resources.

== Washington state forests ==
Name (by alphabetical order)	Location (of main entrance)
Ahtanum State Forest	Yakima County
Blanchard State Forest	Skagit County; Snohomish County
Capitol State Forest	Grays Harbor County
Elbe Hills-Tahoma State Forest	Lewis County; Pierce County
Green Mountain-Tahuya State Forest	Kitsap County; Mason County
Little Pend Oreille State Forest	Pend Oreille County; Stevens County
Loomis-Loup Loup State Forest	Okanogan County
Olympic Peninsula State Forest	Clallam County
Teanaway Community Forest	Kittitas County
Tiger Mountain State Forest	King County
Yacolt Burn State Forest	Clark County

== See also ==
- List of national forests of the United States
