= Gloria Mendoza =

American politician and businessman

Member of the Washington House of Representatives from the 14th district
- Incumbent
- Assumed office January 13, 2025 Serving with Deb Manjarrez
- Preceded by: Chris Corry
- Succeeded by: Chelsea Dimas (elect)

Mayor of Grandview
- In office 2018–2023
- Preceded by: Norm Childress
- Succeeded by: Ashley Lara

Member of the Grandview City Council
- In office 2013–2018

Personal details
- Born: c. 1971 (age c. 54) Mexico
- Party: Republican

Maria Gloria Mendoza (born c. 1971) is a Mexican-born American politician and businesswoman. She is the Washington House of Representatives member representing the state's 14th district, position 1. Prior to running for state house, Mendoza served on the Grandview, Washington city council from 2013 to 2018 and as mayor of Grandview from 2018 to 2023. She was the town's first Latina mayor.

== Early life and career ==
Mendoza was born in Mexico and immigrated to the United States when she was eight, moving to Grandview. She graduated from Grandview High School and attended Yakima Valley College. In 1999, she was invited to join local politics but decided to focus on her new business, GMC Training Institute.

== Political career ==
=== Grandview ===
In 2013, local officials convinced Mendoza to join the city council, which she did unopposed. In December 2018, mayor Norm Childress resigned to join the Yakima County Commission and Mendoza was appointed by the council to fill the remainder of the term. She became the Grandview's first female Latina mayor and ran unopposed in 2019 for a full term.

In 2023, Mendoza ran for reelection, the first time against a challenger, against Ashley Lara, a former aide to Congresswoman Jaime Herrera Beutler. Lara defeated Mendoza in the general election, 57% to 43%.

=== Washington House of Representatives ===
After court-ordered redistricting, incumbent representative Chris Corry was redistricted out of the 14th district, having to run in the 15th district for the 2024 election. In May 2024, Mendoza announced she would run for House of Representatives position 1 in the 14th district. She faced two challengers in the primary, Democrat Chelsea Dimas and Republican Andy Kallinen. In the August primary election, Dimas came in first with 37% of the vote, with Mendoza coming in second with 32.7%.

In the general election, Mendoza defeated Dimas, 54% to 45%.

== Electoral history ==
Washington House of Representatives 14th district position 1 general election, 2024
Party	Candidate	Votes	%
Republican	Gloria Mendoza	18,129	54.02
Democratic	Chelsea Dimas	15,242	45.42
	Write-in	189	0.56
Total votes		33,560	100%
