= St. Joseph's Mission (Tampico, Washington) =

- U.S. National Register of Historic Places
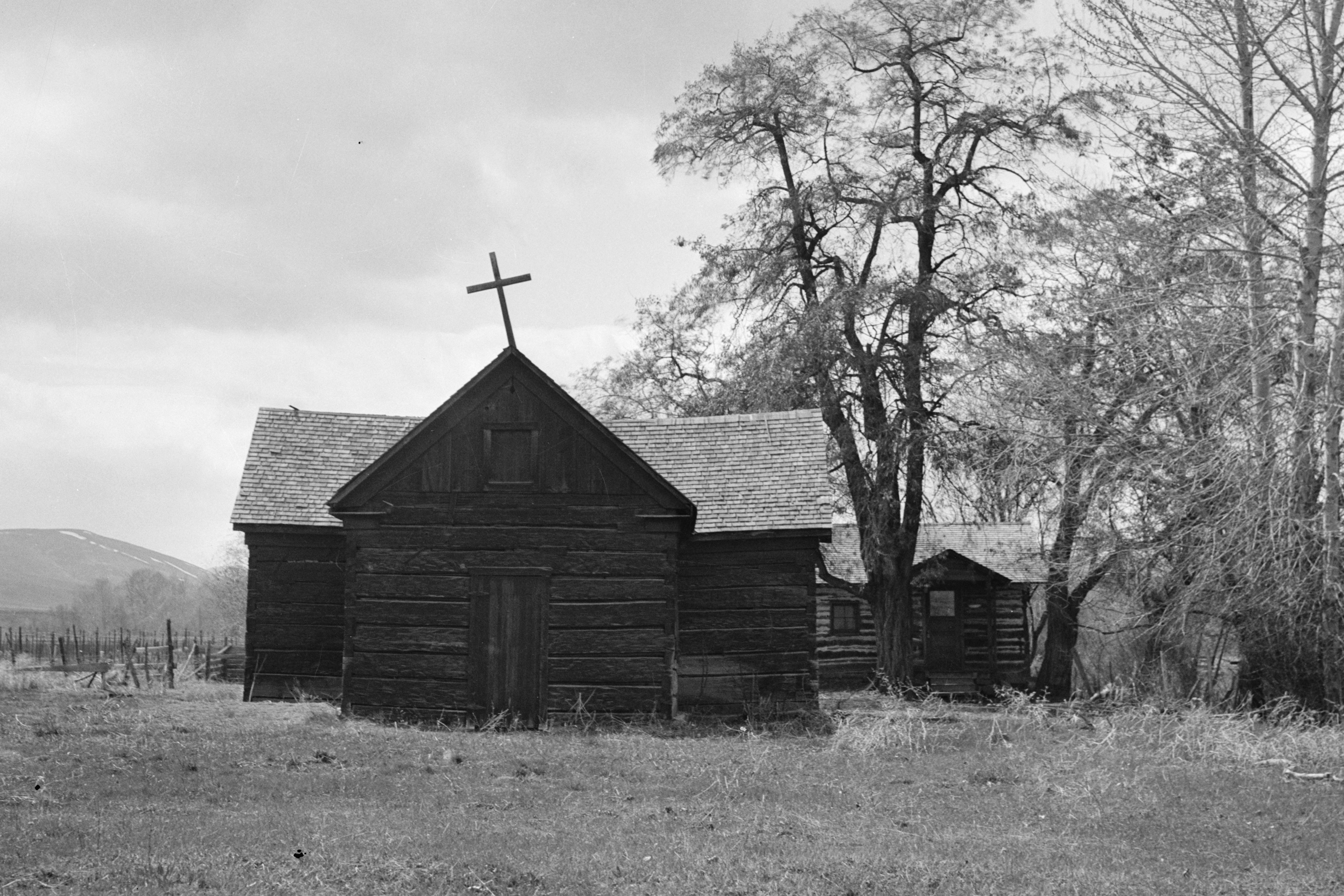
- St. Joseph's Mission
- Location: East of Tampico, Washington on Ahtanum Road
- Nearest city: Yakima, Washington
- Coordinates: 46°31′54″N 120°45′30″W
- Built: 1852
- NRHP reference No.: 76001925
- Added to NRHP: December 22, 1976

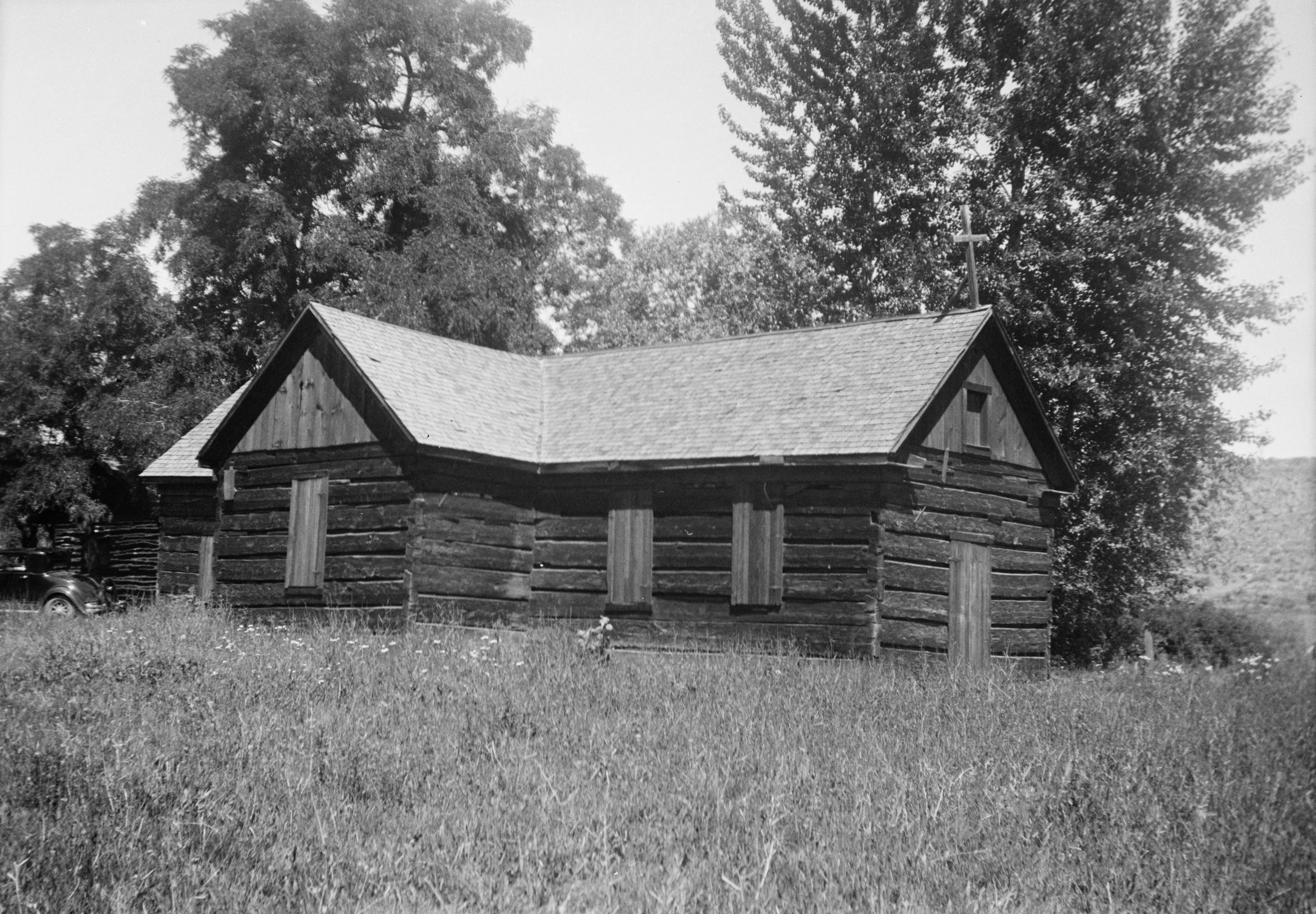
Three point perspective view.

St. Joseph's Mission is a mission that was established in Oregon Territory (now Washington state), United States (US) by Jesuit priests in 1852. The mission is located near Tampico, Washington and was listed on the National Register of Historic Places in 1976.

== History ==
Fathers Louis D'herbomez and Charles Pandosy founded St. Joseph's mission on April 3, 1852, near Ahtanum Creek in the upper Yakima Valley near present-day Yakima. D'herbomez, originally from Le Havre, France arrived in Oregon Territory on 1847, and was ordained a year later. Prior to founding the St. Joseph's Mission, D'herbomez served as priest of the Oblates of Mary Immaculate. Pandosy served at the Saint Rose Mission near Richland and at Conception Mission near Ellensburg.

Archbishop F. N. Blanchet instructed D'herbomez and Pandosy to construct the mission at the summer camp of Yakama Chief Kamiakin, at Kamiakin's request. The mission was constructed on a 677-acre site along Ahtanum Creek, near present-day Tampico. Kamiakin's men helped excavate primitive irrigation canals in the arid soil, allowing them to raise various crops including wheat, corn, pumpkin, potatoes and melons.

The mission was burned down in 1855 during the Yakima Indian War by US army soldiers suspicious that the priests had been collaborating with the Yakamas. The mission was re-established in September 1867 and, a few months later, was rebuilt with the help of the Yakama people. The rebuilt mission was finished in 1870.

== See also ==
- List of National Historic Landmarks in Washington (state)
- National Register of Historic Places listings in Yakima County, Washington
