= John W. Maloney =

American architect

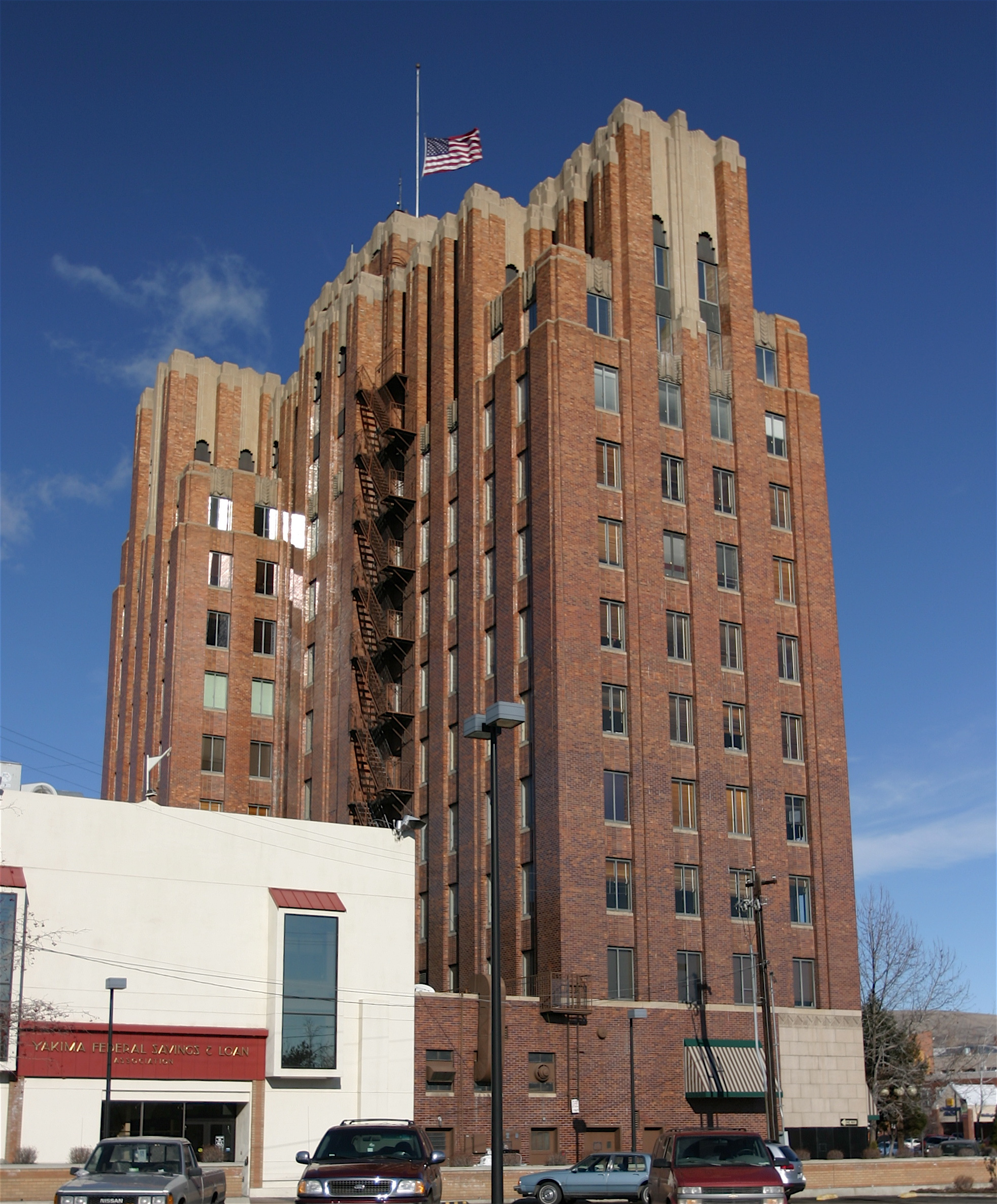
A.E. Larson Building, Yakima

John W. Maloney (October 6, 1896 – January 23, 1978) was an American architect, responsible for numerous public buildings in the Pacific Northwest region of the United States in the mid-20th Century. Maloney was a master of both historic and contemporary styles of architecture.

== Early life and education ==
Maloney was born in Sacramento, California in 1896. His family subsequently moved to the Puget Sound area of Washington, where he graduated from Auburn High School. Maloney attended the University of Washington and Stanford University, serving in the armed forces in World War I.

== Architectural career ==
Maloney established a practice in Yakima, Washington in 1922. He designed the Art Deco A. E. Larson Building, Yakima's most prominent structure, in 1931. In 1940 he designed the campus of the Perry Technical Institute in Yakima. Maloney moved to Seattle in 1943 where his office designed public and private buildings, including work at Washington State University, Central Washington University and Gonzaga University, as well as a number of schools for the Seattle Public School District. Other clients included the Seattle Archdiocese of the Catholic Church, for which he also designed schools. Maloney also designed a number of significant commercial buildings in Washington, and hospitals in Washington, Oregon, California and Utah. Until 1963, Maloney was a sole practitioner. That year, he partnered to form Maloney, Herrington, Freesz & Lund, transitioning into a more modern style of work.

Maloney retired in 1970. Maloney, Herrington, Freesz & Lund eventually became Mills, John and Rigdon. Maloney died on January 23, 1978, in Seattle.

== Selected works ==
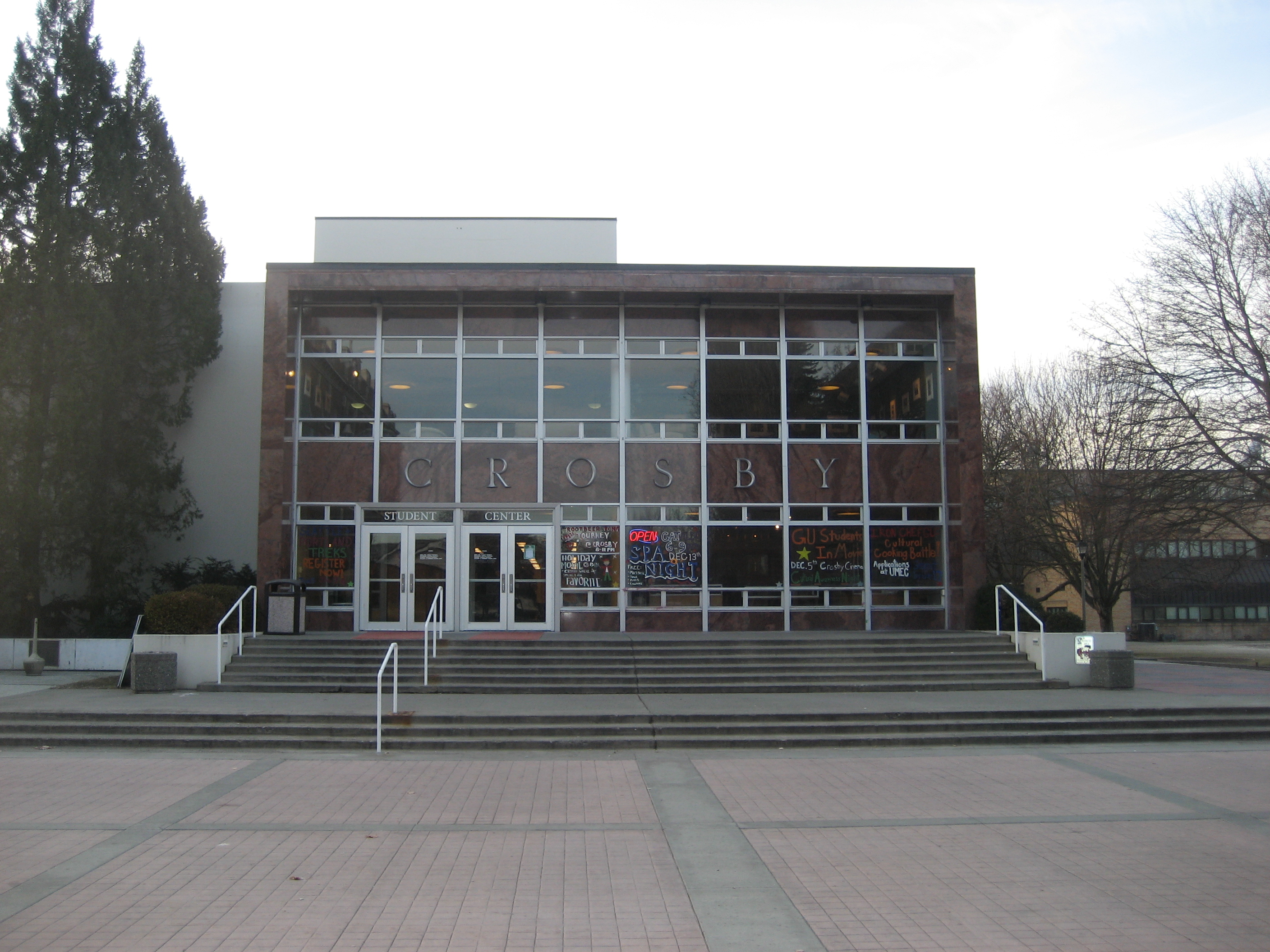
Crosby Student Center at Gonzaga University

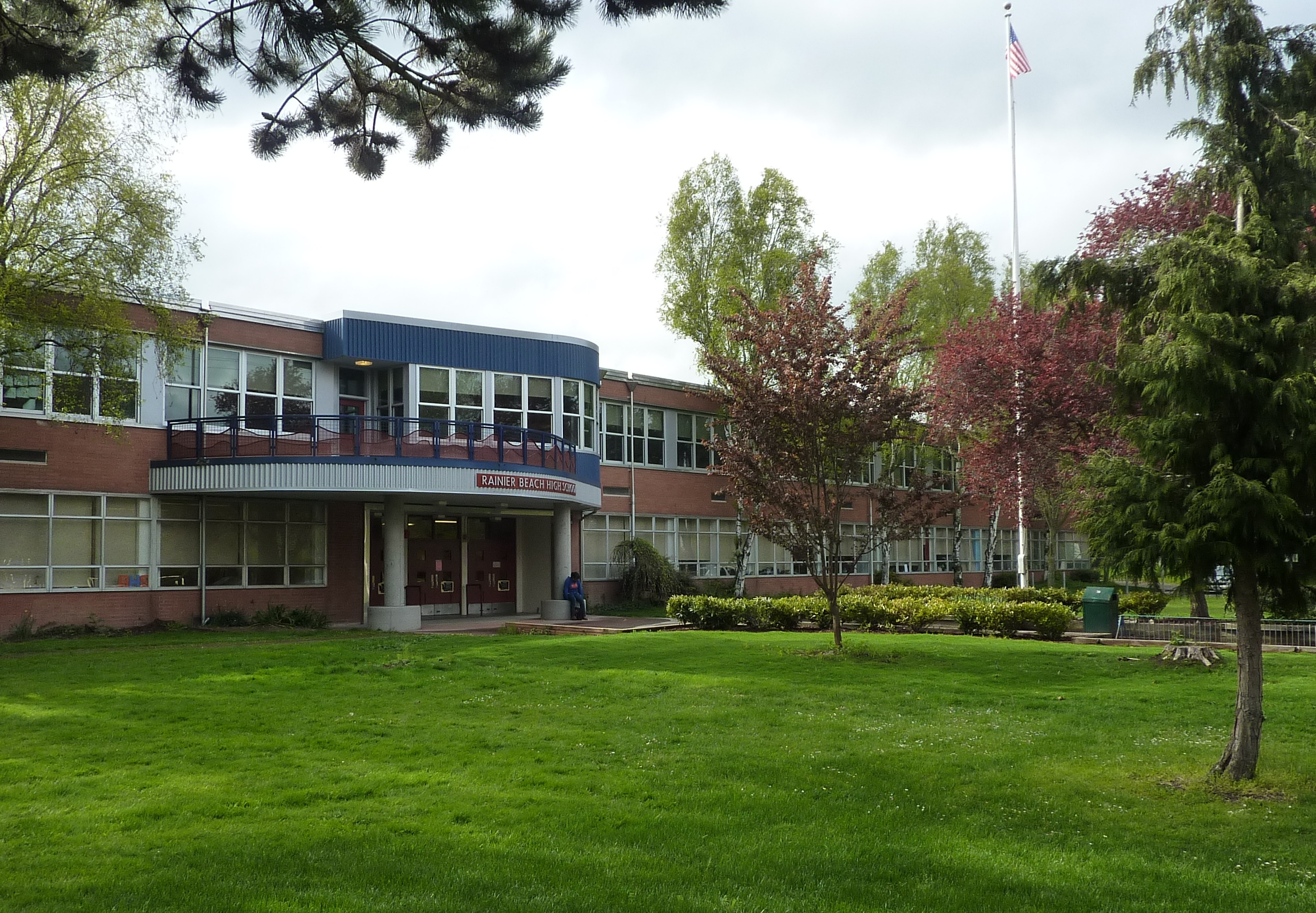
Rainier Beach High School

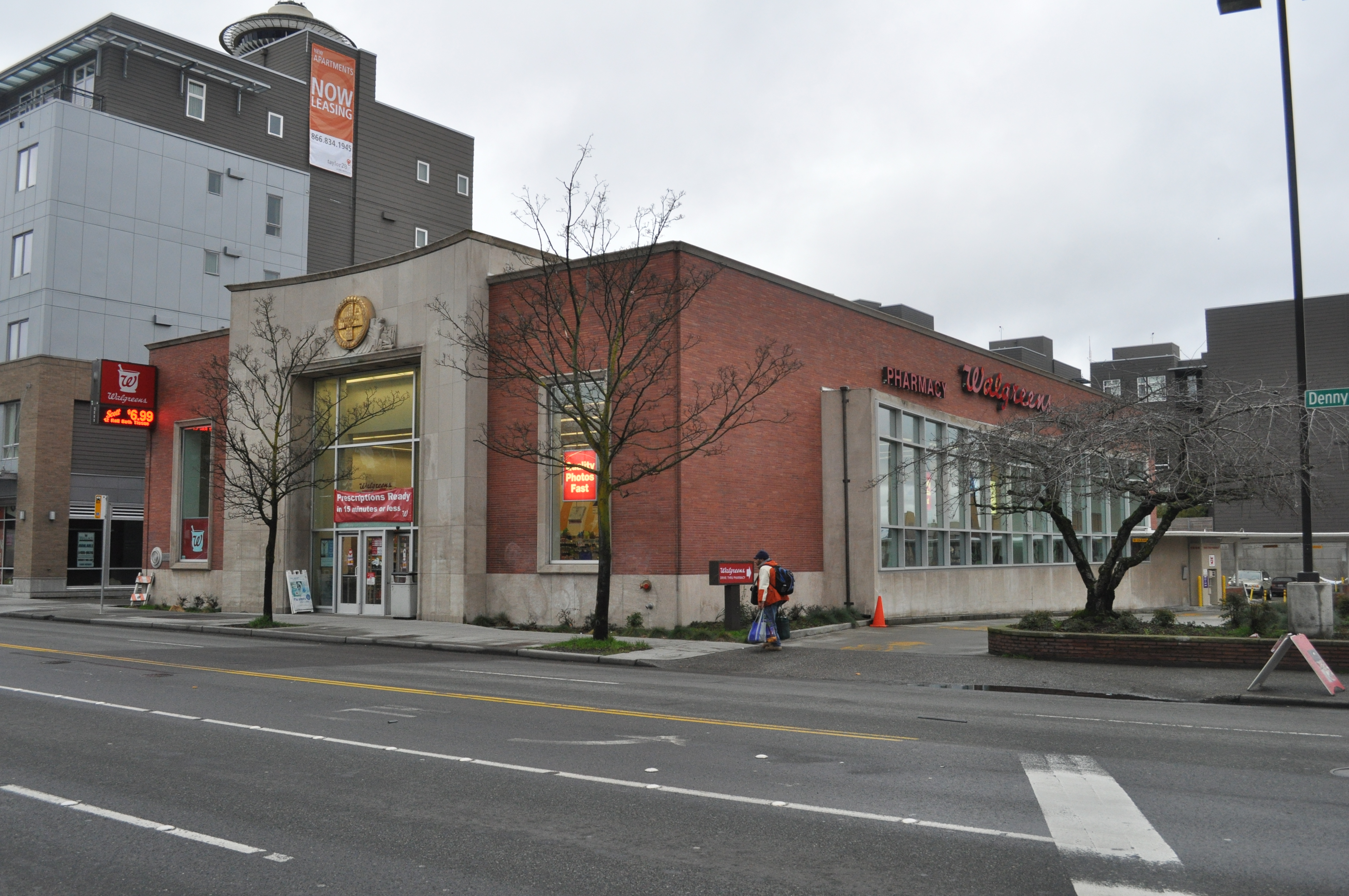
SeaFirst (First National Bank of Seattle), Denny Way

- Yakima Indian Agency Building, Yakima, Washington (1922)
- Smyser Hall, Central Washington University (1925)
- Saint Paul's Cathedral and School, Yakima, Washington (1927)
- Benjamin Franklin Junior High School, Yakima, Washington (1928)
- A. E. Larson Building, Yakima, Washington (1931)
- YWCA, Yakima, Washington (1935)
- McConnell Auditorium, Central Washington University (1935)
- Thorp Elementary School, Thorp, Washington (1935–36)
- Compass High School, Grandview, Washington (1937)
- Perry Technical Institute, Yakima, Washington (1940)
- Providence Hospital (now Providence Alaska Medical Center), Anchorage, Alaska (1940)
- Lind Hall, Central Washington University (1947)
- Johnson Tower, Washington State University (1949)
- Wilmer-Davis Hall, Washington State University (1950)
- Holland Library, Washington State University (1950)
- Smith Gym, Washington State University
- Seattle First National Bank, Denny Way, Seattle, Washington (1950)
- St. Michael Catholic School and Convent, Olympia, Washington (1950)
- Compton Union Building, Washington State University (1951)
- Boeing Company Office Building, Seattle, Washington (circa 1952)
- Eastern Bank and Office Building, Spokane, Washington (1952)
- Todd Hall, Washington State University (1952)
- Northwestern Life Insurance Building, Seattle, Washington (1952)
- St. John's Hospital, Santa Monica, California (1952)
- Buckner Building, Whittier, Alaska (1953)
- Bishop Blanchett High School, Seattle, Washington (1954)
- Mary Bridge Children's Hospital (now MultiCare Mary Bridge Children's Hospital & Health Center), Tacoma, Washington (1954)
- Kittitas County Courthouse, Ellensburg, Washington (1955)
- Yakima County Courthouse, Yakima, Washington (1955)
- Holyrod Mausoleum, Shoreline, Washington (1955)
- Marycrest Hall, Seattle University (1956)
- Holy Family Church, Seattle, Washington (1956)
- Minimum Security Facility, Washington State Penitentiary, Walla Walla, Washington (1957)
- Bing Crosby Library (now Crosby Student Center), Gonzaga University (1957)
- Welch Hall, Gonzaga University (1957)
- Holy Cross Hospital (now Salt Lake Regional Medical Center), Salt Lake City, Utah (1958–59)
- St. Thomas the Apostle Seminary, Kenmore, Washington (1958)
- YMCA, Yakima, Washington (circa 1959)
- Rainier Beach High School, Seattle, Washington (1959–60)
- St. Anne's Catholic Church and Refectory, Seattle, Washington (1960)
- Providence Heights Hospital, Seattle, Washington (1961)
- Boeing Flight Test Center and Engineering Building, Seattle, Washington
