= Edgar Rock Lodge =

Historic house in Washington, United States

- U.S. National Register of Historic Places
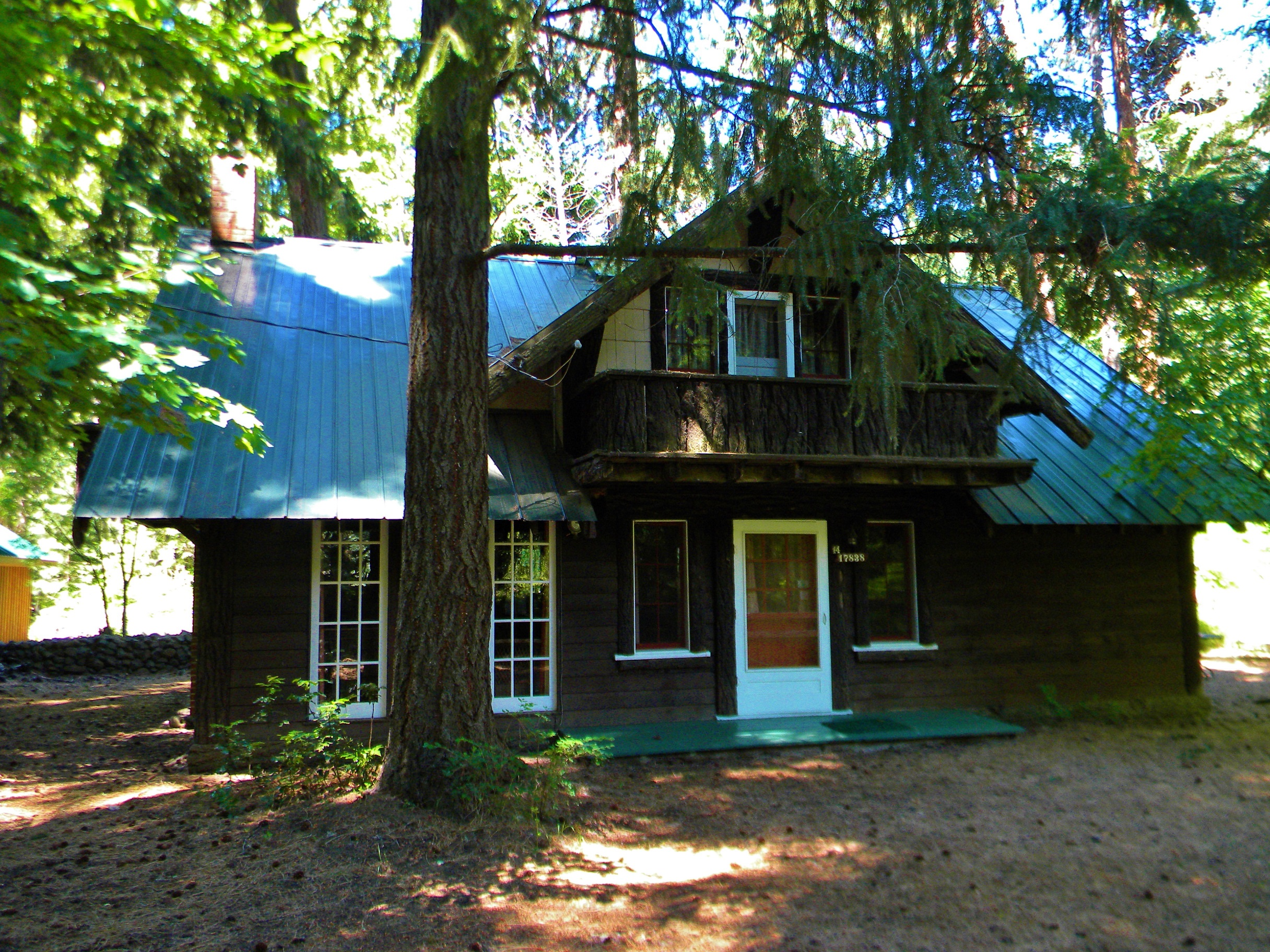

- Location within Washington (state)
- Location: 380 Old Naches Rd., Naches, Washington
- Coordinates: 46°55′16″N 121°3′3″W
- Area: 2 acres (0.81 ha)
- Built: 1904
- NRHP reference No.: 96000843
- Added to NRHP: August 1, 1996

The Edgar Rock Lodge is a rustic house in Yakima County, Washington. The house was used as a way station on the road over Chinook Pass to Bumping Lake. It was built by prospector Dick Darlington around 1904, who named the house after a nearby rock formation. When construction of Bumping Lake Dam started in 1901, Darlington worked as a cook on the dam project, and the lodge was used as one of several way stations for supplies that were brought to the remote dam site on horse and wagon. When the road was paved in 1916 the lodge continued to serve as a stopping point for travelers.

== Description ==
The Edgar Rock Lodge is a unique example for vertical log construction, using 10-inch (25 cm) diameter logs set on end on a sill plate over a stone foundation. The 1 1/2-story house measures about n40 feet (12 m) by 22 feet (6.7 m). The house is rectangular, with a porch the full length of the main elevation, covered by a shed roof extension. The logs extend halfway up the second floor, to the bottom of the attic windows. A single dormer is set in the center of the front roof elevation. The roof is asphalt roll roofing, seamed vertically along the slope of the roof rather than shingled along its length. The porch has square posts, but the railings are logs. The log walls are exposed on the interior, with sand and cement chinking. The interior features a stone fireplace, but is otherwise plain. A nearby root cellar is included in the complex.

The Edgar Rock Lodge was placed on the National Register of Historic Places on August 1, 1996.
