= Yakima Indian Agency Building =

- U.S. National Register of Historic Places
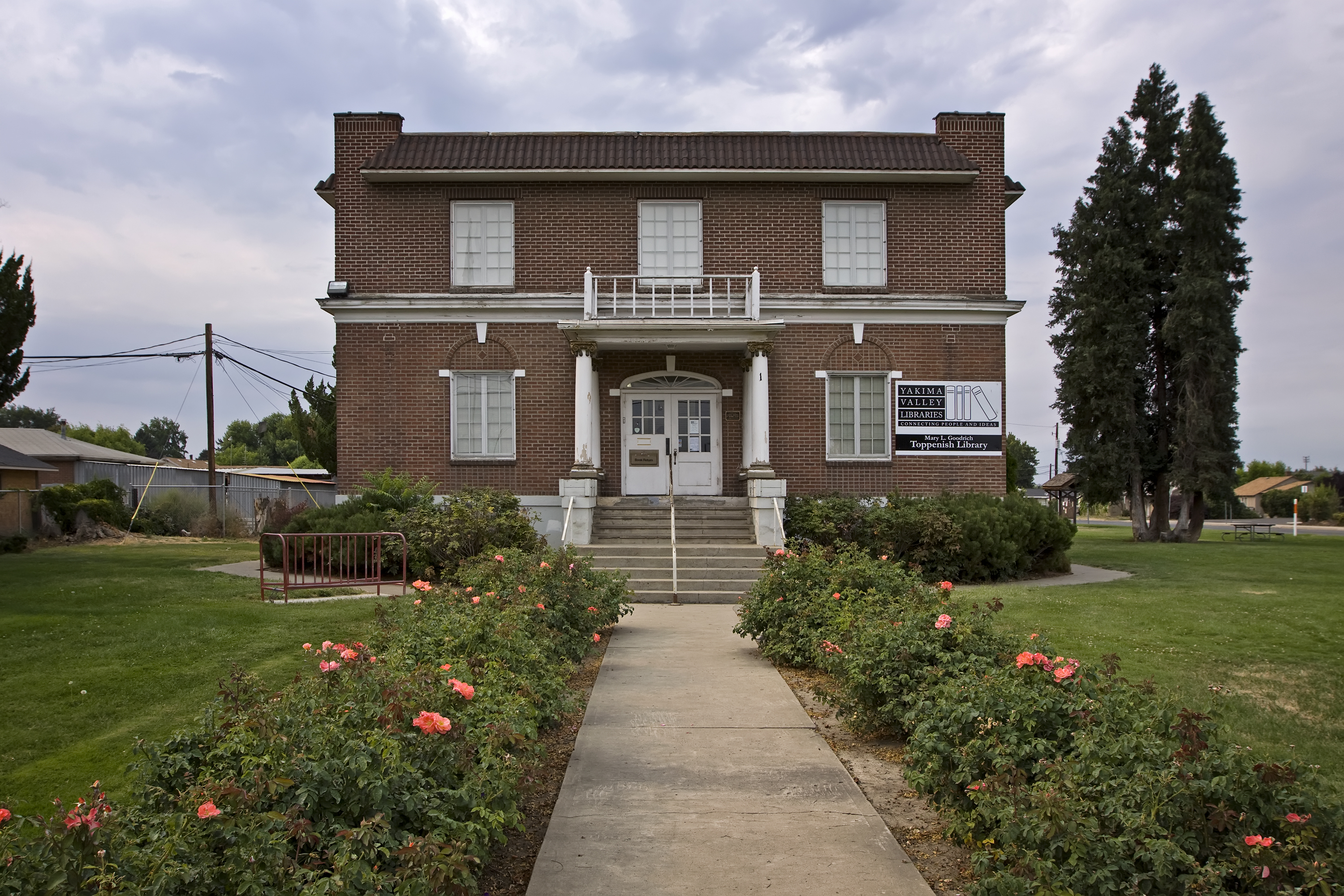

- Location within Washington (state)
- Location: 1 S. Elm, Toppenish, Washington
- Coordinates: 46°22′44.14″N 120°18′55.13″W
- Area: less than one acre
- Built: 1922
- Architect: Maloney, John; Yeaman, William
- Architectural style: Classical Revival
- NRHP reference No.: 88000605
- Added to NRHP: May 19, 1988

The Yakima Indian Agency Building, also known as the Mary L. Goodrich Library and the Toppenish Historical Museum, is a building in Toppenish, Washington. It was built in 1921, initially as a one-story building, with a second story added in 1931. It was designed by Yakima architect John W. Maloney in an adapted Classical Revival style for the federal Indian Bureau as the agency's point of liaison with the Yakama Nation. By 1946 the structure was vacated by the Indian Bureau, and it was sold to the local school district in 1949 and was used as a junior high school until 1954. In 1954 it became a library, to which a museum of local history was added in 1976.

== Description ==
The Yakima Indian Agency is a two-story brick structure measuring 45 feet (14 m) to the front and rear and 66 feet (20 m) along the sides. A 5-foot (1.5 m) by 15-foot (4.6 m) bay protrudes from the rear elevation. The building features a stringcourse where the original roof rested at the top of the first floor. The corners are marked by brick buttresses extending full height, with tiled skirt roof elements in between. The entry is marked by a small Ionic portico at the top of a flight of stairs. Windows are casement units dividing in the middle on the front and sides, with single swinging sashes to the rear. The first floor windows have arched blind lunettes above with stone keystones. The building rests on an elevated concrete basement. The first floor has an entry hall flanked by large rooms, now used for the library. A stairway extends from the entry hall to the second floor, where six rooms house the museum.

The Yakima Indian Agency Building was placed on the National Register of Historic Places on May 19, 1988.
