= Rupert Card House =

- U.S. National Register of Historic Places
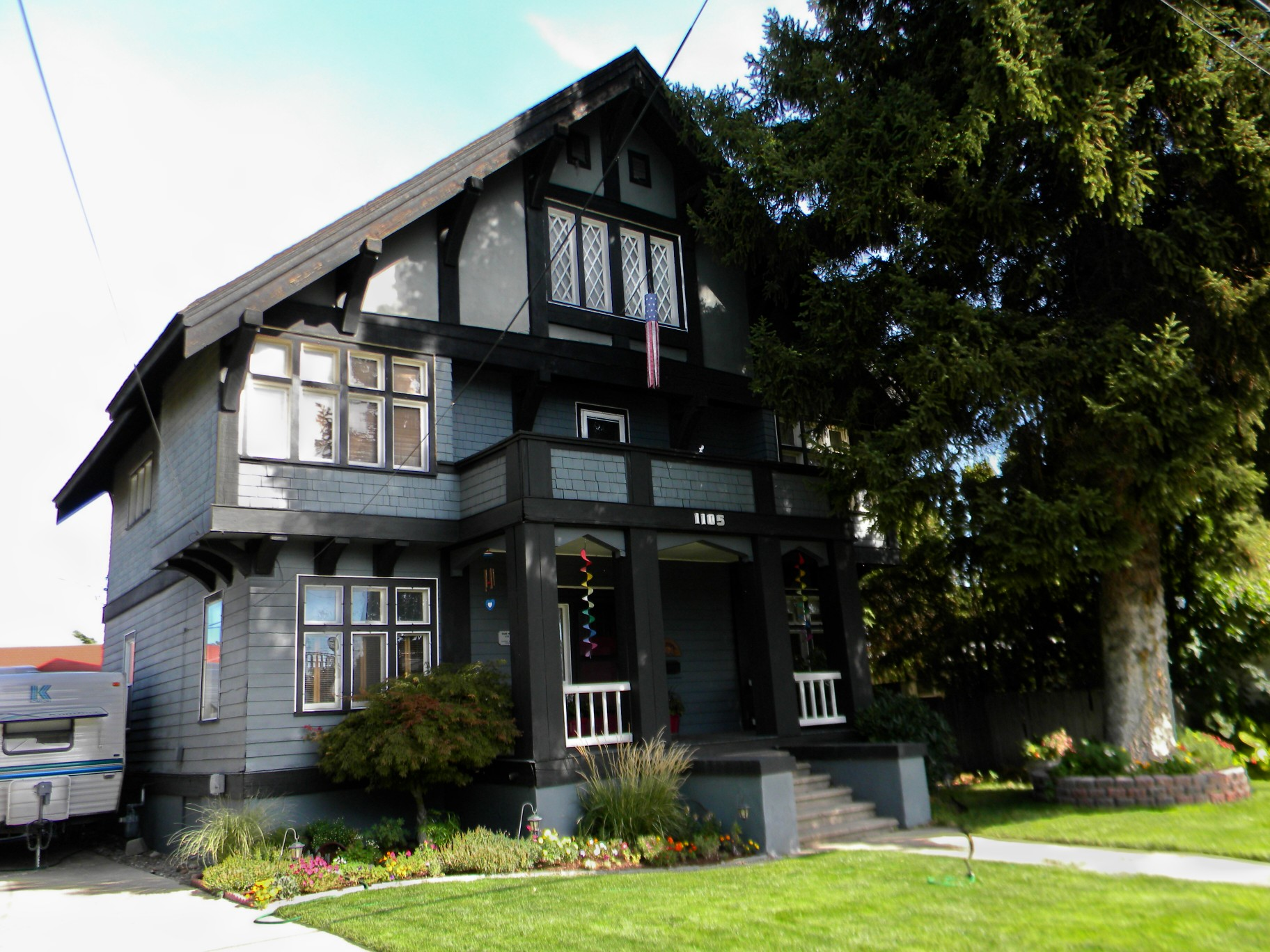
- Rupert Card House, Yakima, Washington

- Location within Washington (state)
- Location: 1105 W. A St., Yakima, Washington
- Coordinates: 46°35′58″N 120°31′32″W
- Area: 0.17 acres (0.069 ha)
- Built: ca. 1905-1915
- Architect: Unknown
- Architectural style: Craftsman and English Revival
- NRHP reference No.: 87000063
- Added to NRHP: February 18, 1987

The Rupert Card House in Yakima, Washington is a Craftsman and English Revival house built between 1905 and 1915. The house was built during Yakima's second period of growth in the early 20th century when streetcars made suburbs more accessible to a growing population.

This residence is important for its association with Rupert Card and the State Floral Company (later McCormick Nursery), Yakima's leading landscape nursery. The house is notable for its eclectic design, and was added to the National Register of Historic Places in 1987.
