= Powell House (Yakima, Washington) =

Historic house in Washington, United States

- U.S. National Register of Historic Places
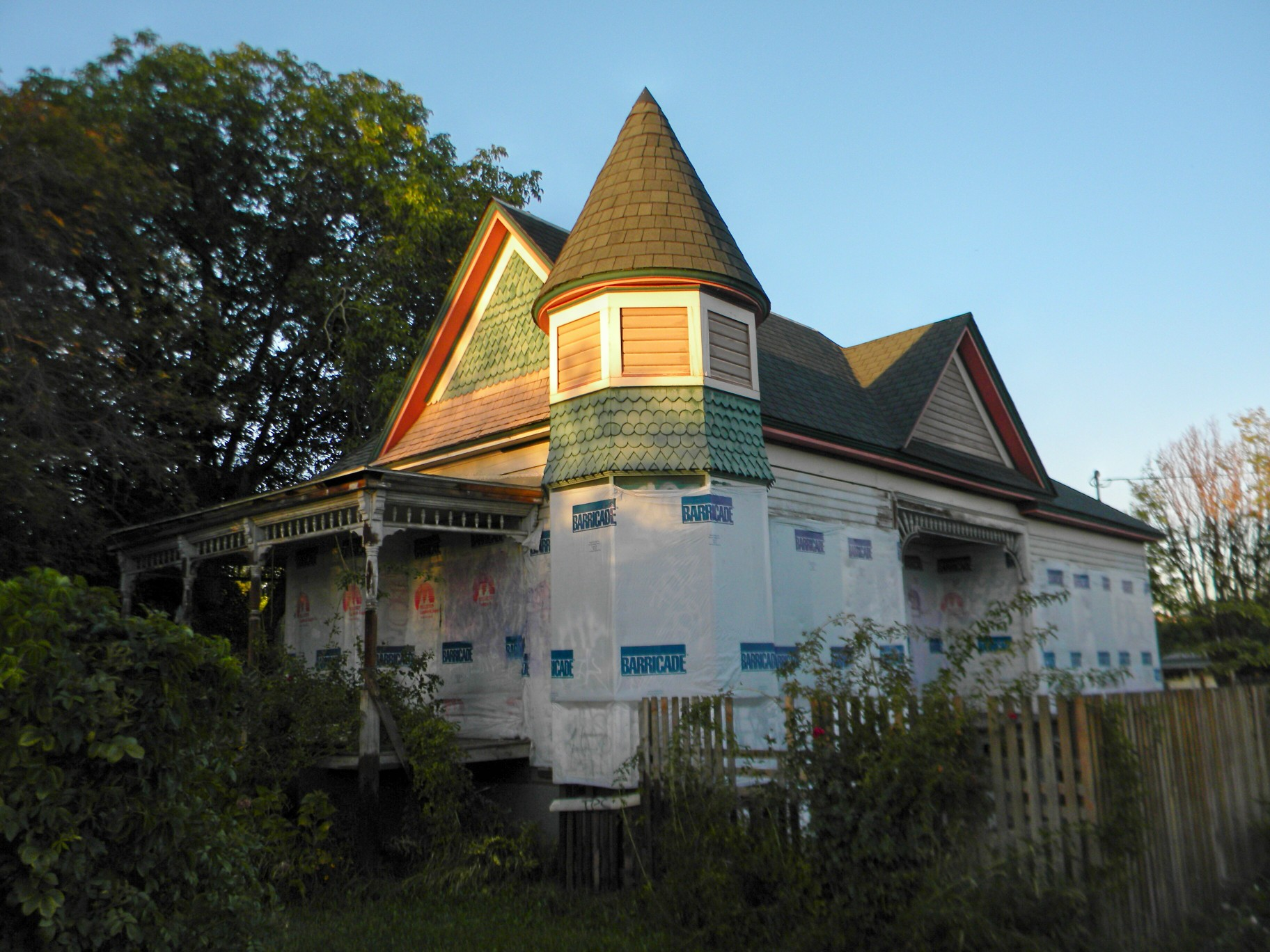

- Location within Washington (state)
- Location: 207 S. Ninth St., Yakima, Washington
- Coordinates: 46°36′7″N 120°29′30″W
- Area: less than one acre
- Built: 1895
- Architectural style: Queen Anne
- MPS: Yakima TR
- NRHP reference No.: 87000085
- Added to NRHP: February 18, 1987

The Powell House is an historic U.S. home located in Yakima, Washington at 207 South 9th Street.

== Overview ==
Built in 1895, the Victorian era Powell House is a one-story, wood-frame residence built in the Queen Anne style. It was built on farm property on the east edge of the City but is now fully within the city proper.

== See also ==
- Historic preservation
