= A. E. Larson Building =

Office building in Yakima, Washington, US

- A.E. Larson Building
- U.S. National Register of Historic Places
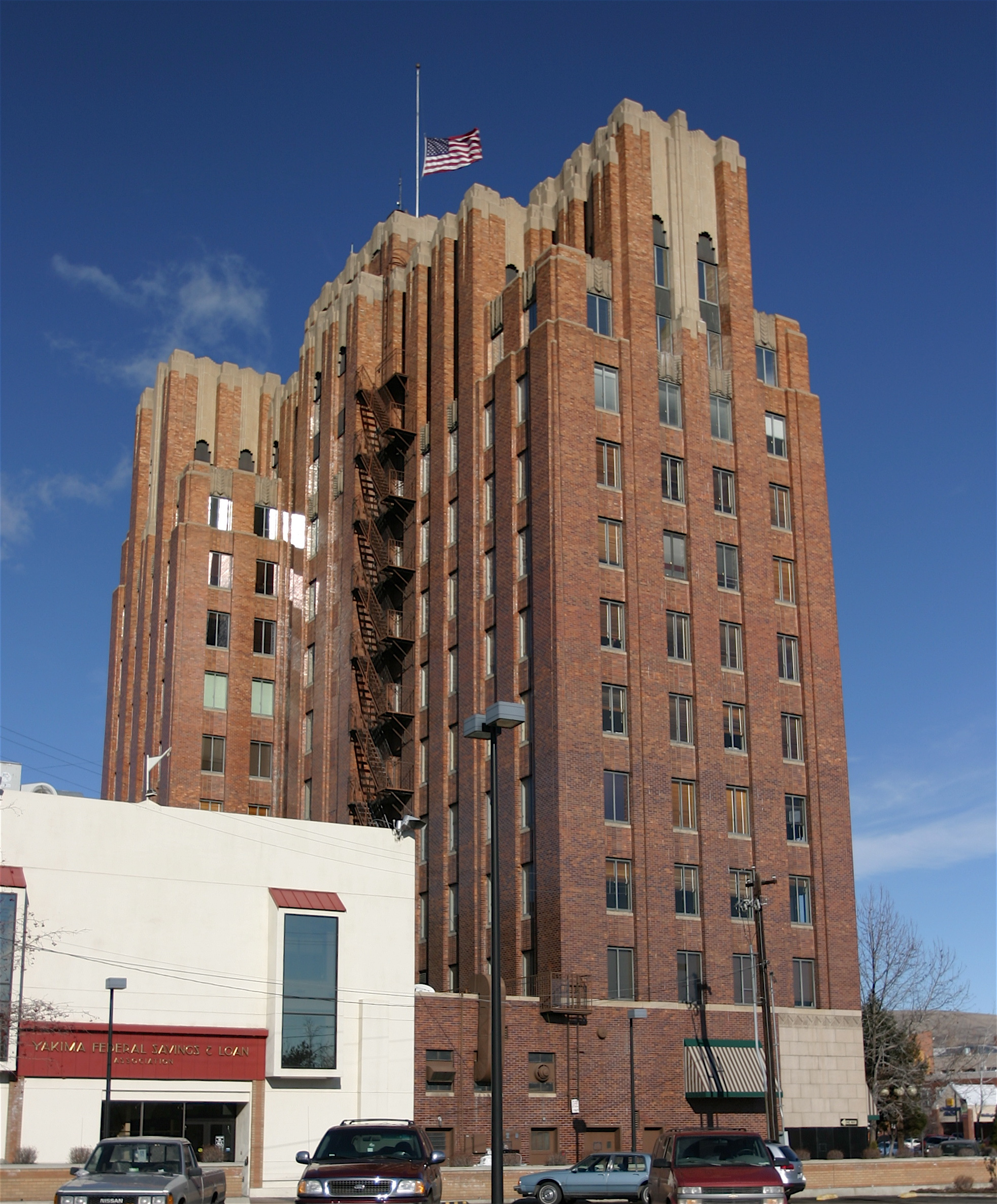

- Location within Washington (state)
- Location: 6 S. 2nd St., Yakima, Washington
- Coordinates: 46°36′8″N 120°30′13″W
- Area: less than one acre
- Built: 1931
- Architect: John W. Maloney
- Architectural style: Art Deco
- NRHP reference No.: 84003647
- Added to NRHP: September 11, 1984

The A.E. Larson Building is a prominent Art Deco office building in Yakima, Washington, built in 1931. When it was built the eleven-story brick structure was by far the tallest building in Yakima, an otherwise low-lying town, and remains the tallest building in Yakima to this day. It was built by entrepreneur Adelbert E. Larson and designed by local architect John W. Maloney.

== Description ==
The A.E. Larson Building is 188 feet (57 m) tall to the top of its flagpole, and is 130 feet (40 m) by 65 feet (20 m) in plan. It is eleven stories tall, with retail shops on the ground floor, together with the main lobby. The building is clad in salmon-colored brick and terra cotta. The ground level is faced with stone with Art Deco bronze accents. The building rises straight from this base to the tenth floor, where it steps back, with deeper setbacks on the eleventh floor. The lobby is richly detailed in stone and bronze, with elaborate bronze surrounds at the three elevator entrances. The building's original windows are a unique vertically-hinged steel casement that allows cleaning from inside.

== History ==
Adelbert E. Larson was born in Minnesota, arriving in Washington in 1884, where he worked in lumber camps. He came to Yakima in 1891 to buy a lumberyard. A successful businessman, he bought real estate, involved himself in politics and promoted local business. Despite the Great Depression, Larson committed $600,000 of his own funds to build the A.E. Larson Building in 1931, benefiting from reduced construction costs. He hired John W. Maloney, a Yakima architect, to design his building, and the Hans Pederson Construction Company to build it. The new tower replaced a bank building on the site. Larson died in 1934, and Maloney moved to Seattle in 1946.

The A.E. Larson Building was listed on the National Register of Historic Places on September 11, 1984.

Despite Larson's certainty, the economic prospects of Yakima were bright and his goal of the building ushering in a new era for the city, unlike the art deco Northern Life Tower in Seattle which has since been surrounded by larger skyscrapers, slower economic growth in Yakima County means the Larson Building continues to stand mostly alone in Yakima's skyline.
