= Carbonneau Mansion =

- U.S. National Register of Historic Places
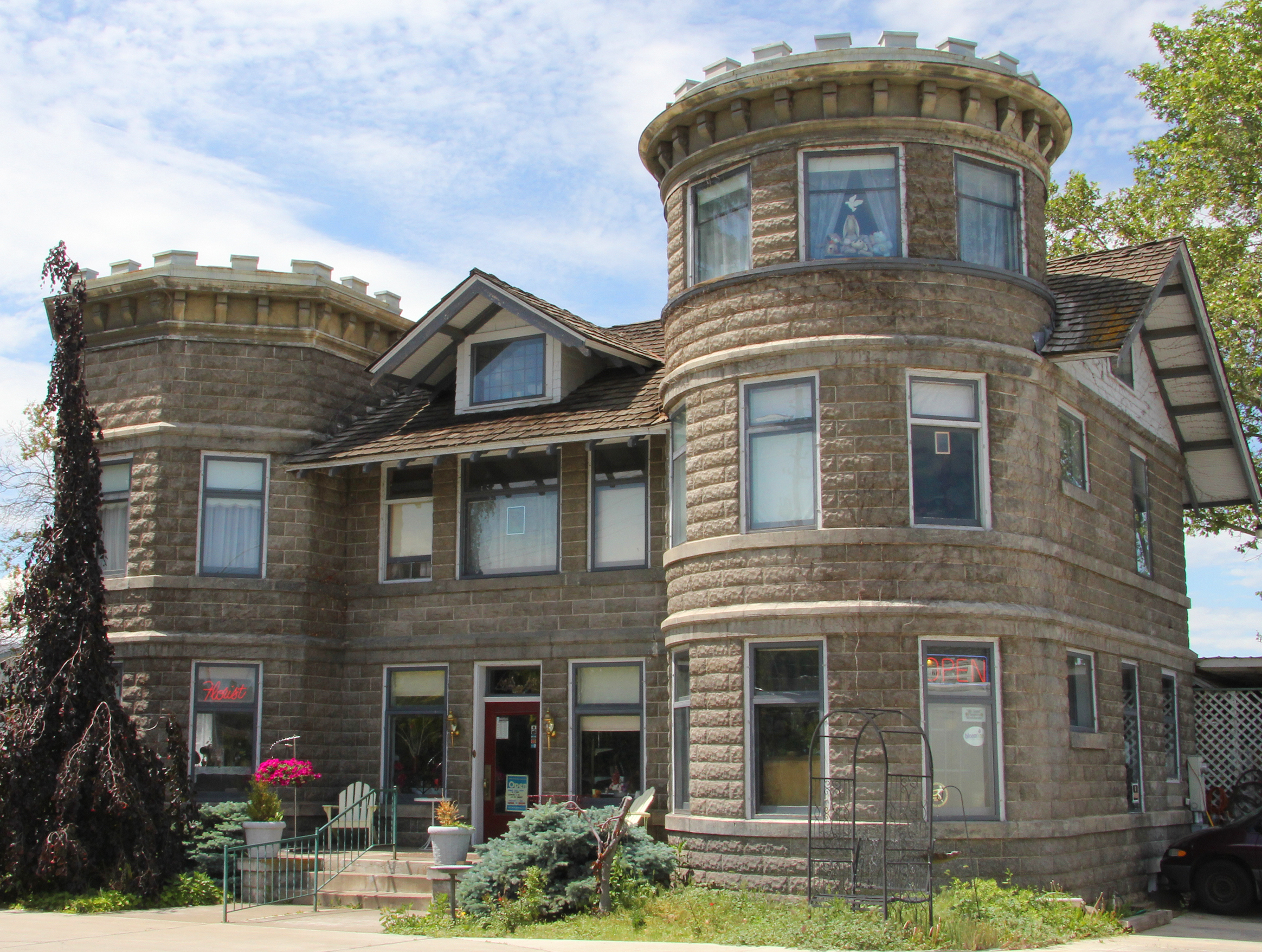
- Front of the home

- Location within Yakima County Location within the United States
- Location: 620 S 48th Ave, Yakima, Washington
- Coordinates: 46.59142°N 120.57279°W
- Area: less than one acre
- Built: 1910
- Architect: Unknown
- Architectural style: French-inspired Vernacular
- NRHP reference No.: 76001927
- Added to NRHP: December 12, 1976

The Carbonneau Mansion is a substantial, well-preserved American home built in 1910 on the west side of Yakima, Washington. The home was built and occupied by the notable Klondike entrepreneur Belinda Mulrooney. Mulrooney and her husband (the self-styled "Count" Charles Eugene Carbonneau, who claimed to be a French aristocrat, but was actually a champagne salesman and former barber from Quebec) built the mansion on a ranch they had purchased with funds from the sale of their Klondike mining interests.

The mansion was built with rough cast stone, matching many of the local sandstone or basalt structures built around this time. It is notable for a large ballroom on the second floor, and the two towers on the east (front) side, complete with ramparts and crenellations.

The house was occupied by the Carbonneaus until 1930, and presently houses a museum and gift shop. It is also a private residence.
