= Reuben Sweet House =

Historic house in Washington, United States

- U.S. National Register of Historic Places
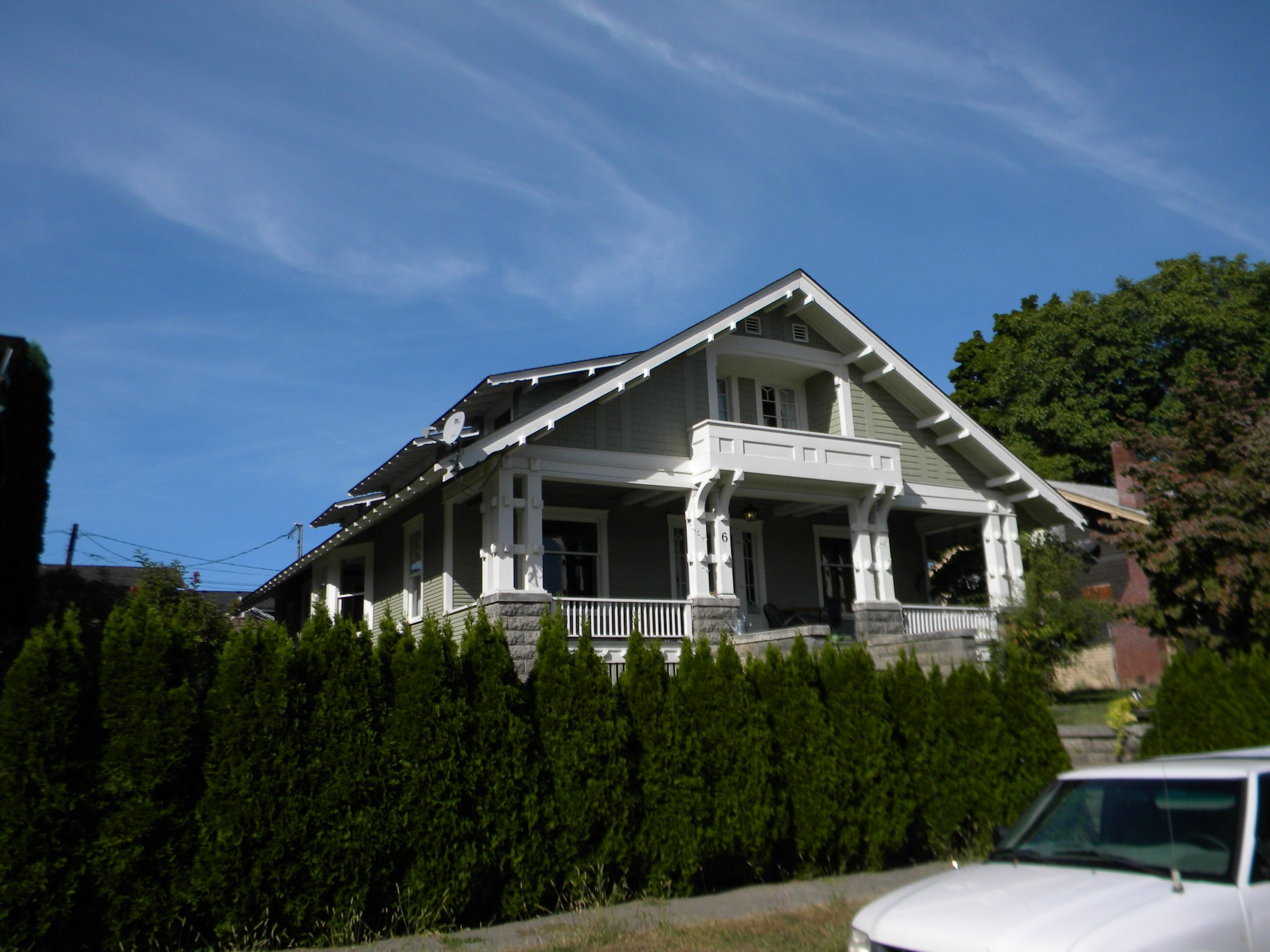

- Location within Washington (state)
- Location: 6 Chicago Ave., Yakima, Washington
- Coordinates: 46°35′52″N 120°31′36″W
- Area: less than one acre
- Built: 1905
- Architectural style: Bungalow/craftsman
- MPS: Yakima TR
- NRHP reference No.: 87000089
- Added to NRHP: February 18, 1987

The Reuben Sweet House, located at 6 Chicago Ave. in Yakima, Washington, United States, was built in 1910 and is listed on the National Register of Historic Places.
