= Kamiakin's Gardens =

First place to be irrigated in the Yakima River valley

- U.S. National Register of Historic Places
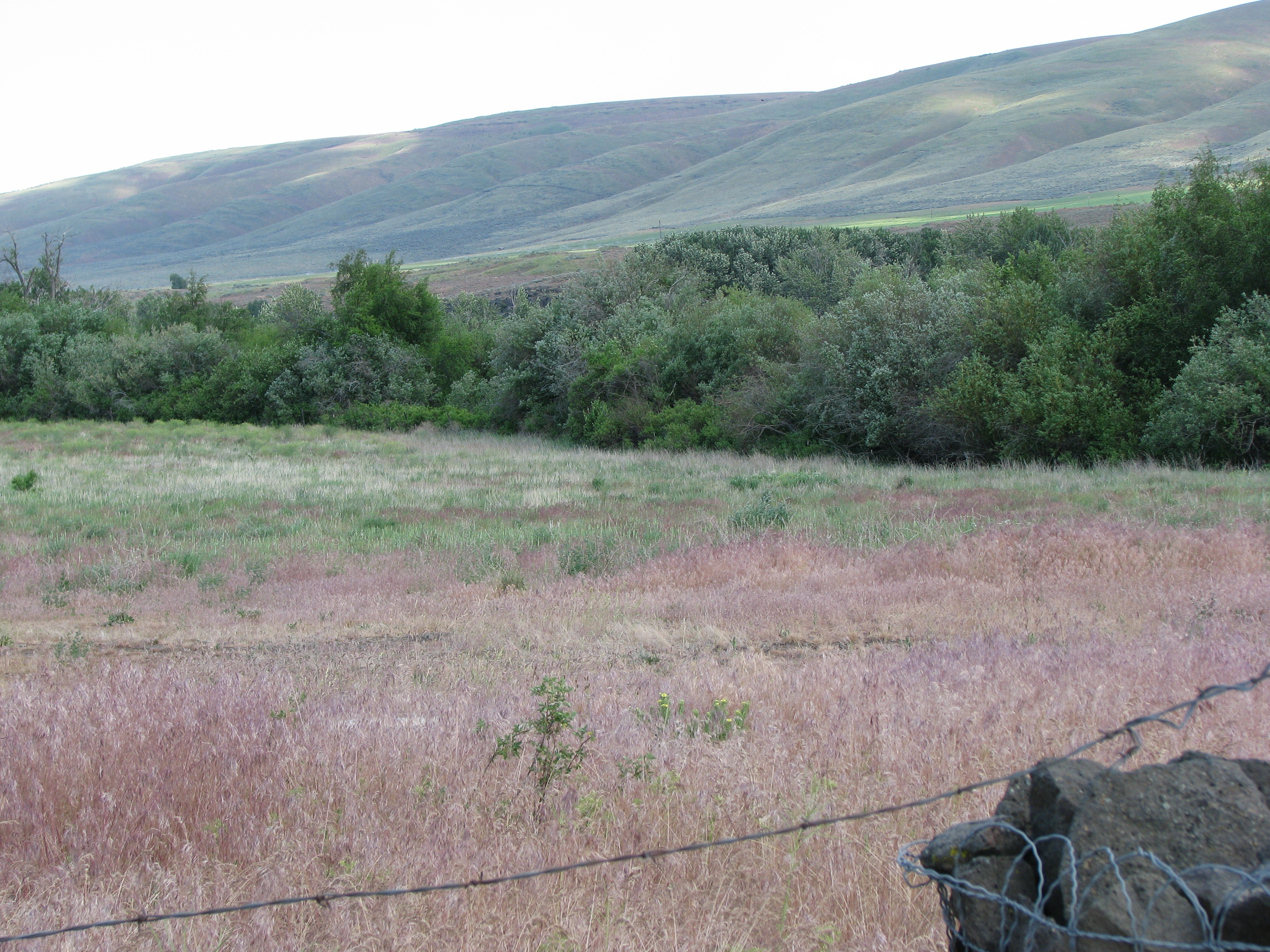

- Location within Washington (state)
- Nearest city: Union Gap, Washington
- Coordinates: 46°31′46″N 120°49′32″W
- Area: 7.8 acres (3.2 ha)
- Built: 1848
- NRHP reference No.: 76001926
- Added to NRHP: December 22, 1976

Kamiakin's Gardens was the first place to be irrigated in the Yakima River valley in central Washington state. Chief Kamiakin (1800–1877) was a leader of the Yakama Nation who sought to avoid conflict with European settlers and missionaries who started arriving in the region in the 1840s. Kamiakin directed that a ditch be excavated to nourish a plot near Ahtanum Creek, hoping to provide a sedentary existence for his people that would keep them out of conflict with the settlers. Crops included squash, corn and potatoes, fed by what became known to settlers as Kamiakin's Ditch. The irrigated area was about 1,300 feet (400 m) long, remnants of which remain visible and are still irrigated. In 1851 a Catholic mission was established near the creek.

Kamiakin's initiative to avoid conflict with the settlers would prove fruitless, and Kamiakin eventually became a leader during the Yakima War of the 1850s.

Kamiakin's Gardens were placed on the National Register of Historic Places on December 22, 1976.
