= Old North Yakima Historic District =

- U.S. National Register of Historic Places
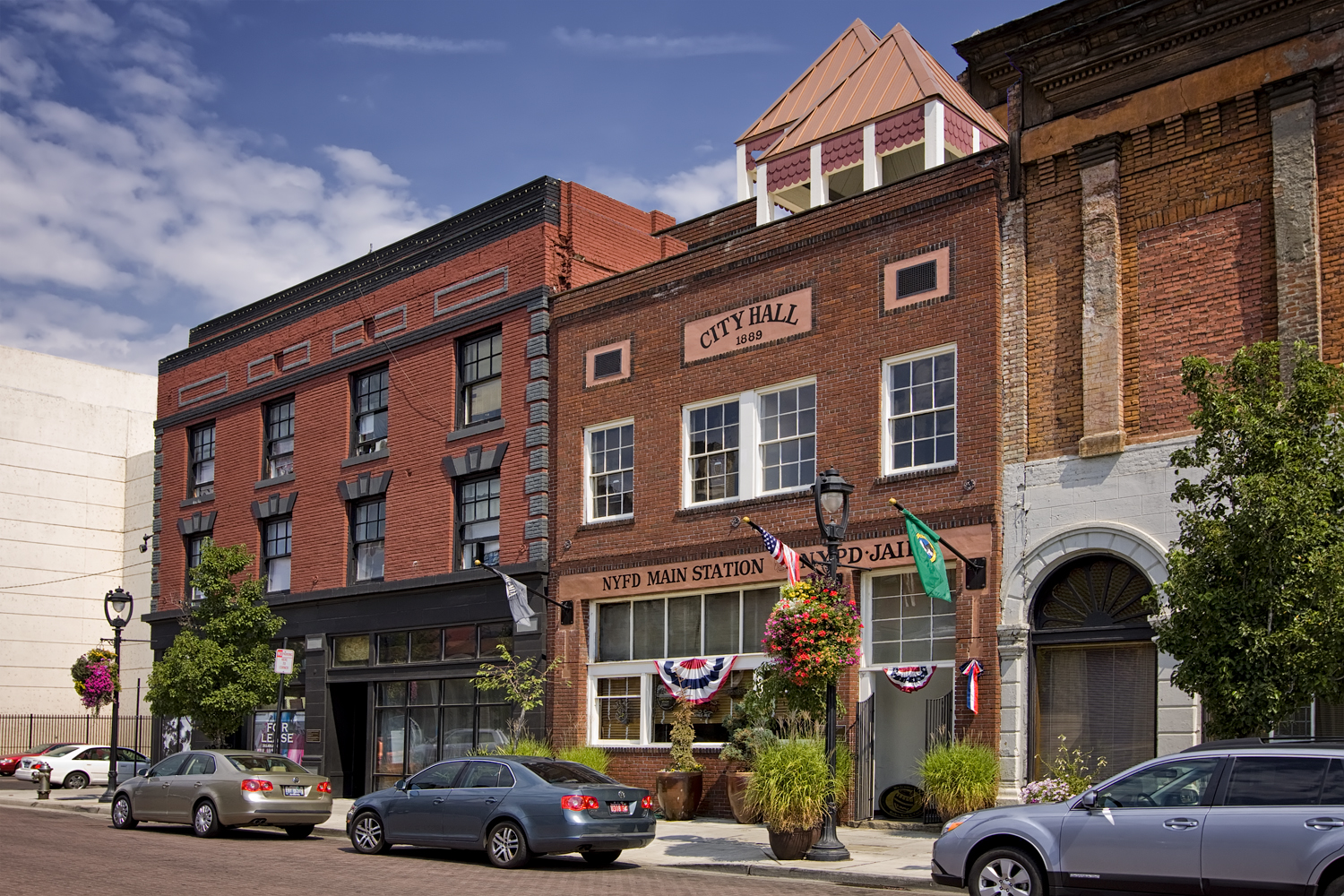
- Old North Yakima Historic District.

- Location within Washington (state)
- Location: Roughly bounded by E. A St., S. First St., E. Yakima Ave., and the Northern Pacific RR tracks, Yakima, Washington
- Area: 4 acres (1.6 ha)
- Architectural style: Late 19th And 20th Century Revivals, Late Victorian, Mixed (more Than 2 Styles From Different Periods)
- NRHP reference No.: 86000960
- Added to NRHP: May 2, 1986

Situated in the heart of downtown Yakima, the Old North Yakima Historic District has been the center of transportation, government, and commerce in the Yakima Valley. In 1885, the Northern Pacific Railroad selected the site for its first depot in the region. Creating North Yakima, the district buildings, the depot, brewery, opera house, hotels and taverns, and retail stores became the nucleus for the present city of Yakima. The district includes a good collection of late Victorian and early 20th century commercial buildings. Modern construction and demolition leave these buildings as a remaining element of the original fabric of Yakima.

== History ==
In the winter of 1884–1885, as the Northern Pacific (NP) wished to avoid a land dispute with nearby Yakima City (now Union Gap), the railroad decided to build a new town 4 miles (6.4 km) to the north. North Yakima was platted on February 4, 1885, and alleged to have been designed after Salt Lake City, with wide streets and alleys and "liberal reserves for public parks." The Northern Pacific gave free lots to those who would settle in the town. Businessmen began moving entire buildings by horses from Yakima City. North Yakima grew rapidly, along Front Street along the NP tracks. The City Hall was built on North Front Street in 1889–1890. A fire in May 1890 destroyed the frame structures along Front Street. A second fire two years later destroyed wood buildings on the corner of East A and North First streets. The fires proved to be only temporary setbacks, as the core of the city was rebuilt and expanded with brick and stone structures. After the 1890 fire, a new Northern Pacific depot was built in 1899, with a landscaped parkway on the railroad right-of-way along Front Street. The Opera House on North Front was experiencing a theatrical revival and hosted numerous public functions, including banquets welcoming National Guardsmen home from the Spanish–American War and the Philippine Insurrection. Although the block bounded on the west and east by North Front and North First streets was, as one source termed it, the "brightest jewel in the city's crown," the area was by 1900 beginning to lose its preeminence in the growing city. The commercial and cultural center in those years shifted eastward from those represented in the Historic District. The district is unique in its age, architecture, and thematic associations.

== Contributing Buildings ==
The buildings in the district were built between 1889 and 1935. The upper-levels retain their original appearance and materials. The structures are listed by their current (1986) names with their street address, historic name, and date constructed.

1. Burlington Northern Passenger Depot, North Front Street (Northern Pacific Railroad Passenger Depot, 1909–1910)

2. Burlington Northern Freight Depot, North Front Street (Northern Express Company Office and Freight Depot, 1909–1910)

3. Greystone Building, 5 North First Street (Lund Building, 1898–1899)

4. Top Que Billiards and Video Games, 7 North Front Street (Commercial Saloon and Lodging House, 1902)

5. Yakima Brewing and Malting Company, and English Pub, 25 North Front Street (Switzer's Opera House, ca. 1890–1891)

6. Old City Hall, 27 North Front Street (Yakima City Hall, 1889–1890; remodeled prior to 1935)

7. Cascade Apartments, 31 North Front Street (Hotel Sydney, 1909)

8. Hotel Roza, 26 North 1st Street (Hotel Michigan, ca. 1914)

9. Blue Banjo Tavern, 22 North 1st Street (Jean B. Dazet and Company Saloon, ca. 1914)

== Bibliographical ==
- Crawford, Jeanne R., ed. As the Valley Was. Yakima Federal Savings and Loan Association, 1968. An Illustrated History of Klickitat. Yakima and Kittitas Counties. Interstate Publishing Co., 1904.
- Lyman, W.D. History of the Yakima Valley. Washington, 2 vols. J.J. Clarke, 1919.
- Martin, George M., Paul Schafer, and William E. Scofield. Yakima t A Centennial Reflection, 1885–1985. Yakima Centennial Commission, 1985.
- Newbill, Jim, and Herb Blisard, eds. Yakima. A Centennial Perspective, 1885–1985. Yakima Centennial Commission, 1984.
- Pechtel, George H. National Register of Historic Places nomination form for the Lund Building, Yakima, Office of Archaeology and Historic Preservation, Olympia, 1983.
- Spike, W.D.C. Spike's North Yakima, Illustrated, 3 Vols. Tacoma and North Yakima, 1890.
- Yakima County Assessor's Office, property ownership records.
- Yakima Daily Republic, 26 April 1910, 22 May 1909, 14 July 1899.
- Yakima Herald. 26 September 1889, 9 January 1890, 22 August 1889, 19 September 1889.
