= Carmichael-Loudon House =

- Carmichael-Louden House
- U.S. National Register of Historic Places
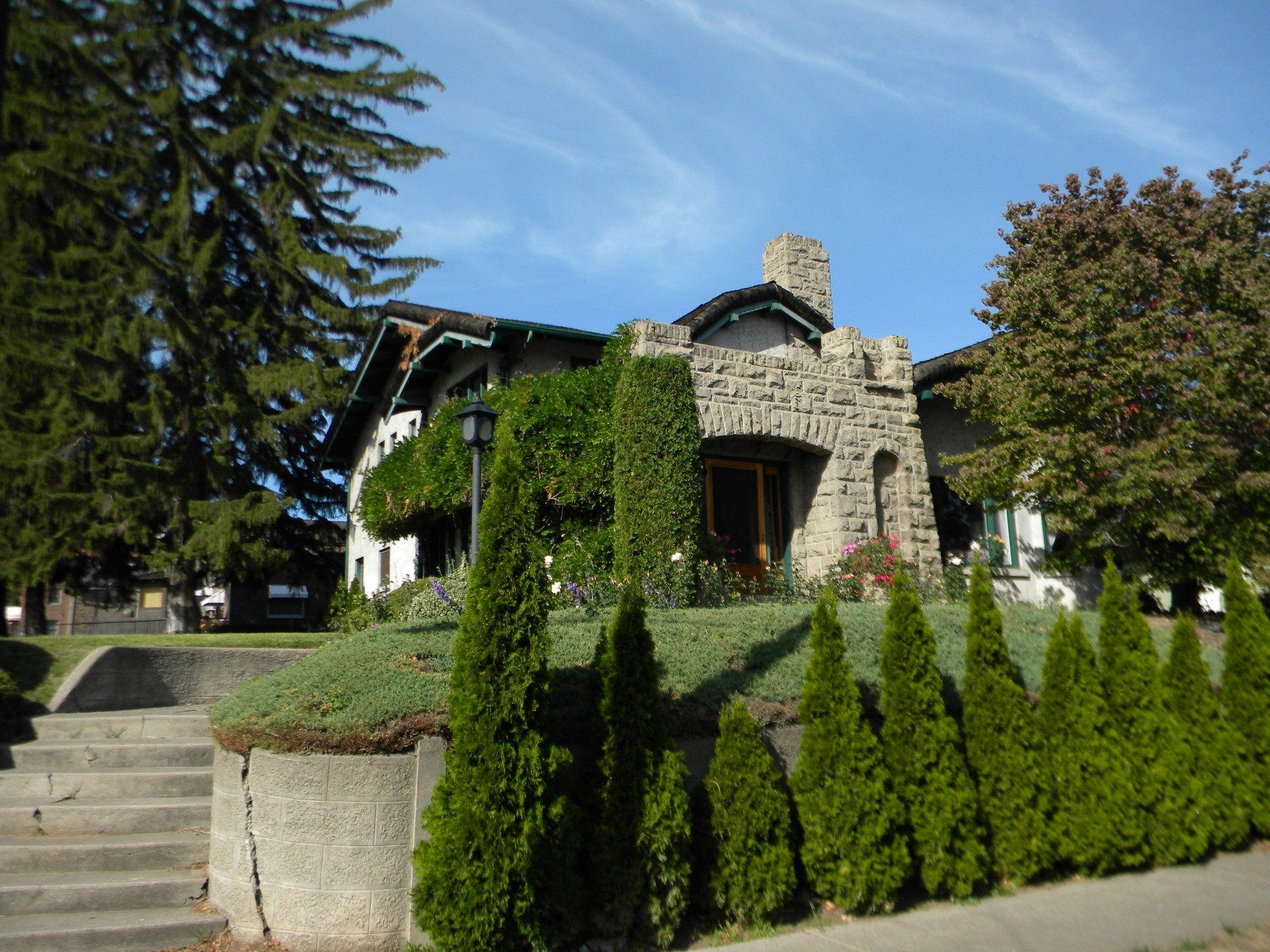
- Carmichael-Loudon House, Yakima WA

- Location within Yakima County Location within the United States
- Location: 2 Chicago Avenue, Yakima, Washington
- Coordinates: 46.5975°N 120.526667°W
- Area: less than one acre
- Built: 1919
- Architect: Unknown
- Architectural style: American Craftsman with English Revival influence
- NRHP reference No.: 87000065
- Added to NRHP: February 18, 1987

The Carmichael-Loudon House is an American Craftsman-style bungalow with English influence. It is an excellent example of Yakima's second wave of development between 1900 and 1920. With the advent of streetcars in Yakima at the time, development began to appear in more suburban areas, including this (the Nob Hill subdivision), platted in 1910.

The home itself is a two-story stucco-cladded residence of a unique blended Craftsman and English Revival design. The home was built in 1919 by Elizabeth Loudon Carmichael, an entrepreneur in the Yakima Valley. Although born in Scotland, Mrs Carmichael came to Yakima from New Zealand with her five young children in 1889. Upon being widowed in 1890, she opened and operated a successful mercantile store in Union Gap. She also established the first creamery in Yakima. Carmichael Creamery ice cream continued to be sold in the area until the 1980s.

Mrs Carmichael also built the Elizabeth Loudon Carmichael House in Union Gap, which is also in the National Register of Historic Places.

The house was listed in the NHRP in 1987, and is currently a private residence.
