= Tampico, Washington =

Unincorporated community in Washington, United States

- Unincorporated community & CDP
- Location within Washington (state)
- Coordinates: 46°32′01″N 120°52′45″W
- Country: United States
- State: Washington
- County: Yakima
- Elevation: 2,136 ft (651 m)

Population (2010)
  - Total: 312
- Time zone: UTC-8 (Pacific (PST))
  - Summer (DST): UTC-7 (PDT)
- ZIP code: 98903
- Area code: 509
- FIPS code: 53-70245
- GNIS feature ID: 2585046

Tampico is a census-designated place and unincorporated community in Yakima County, Washington, United States, located approximately eighteen miles west of Yakima on Ahtanum Creek. As of the 2020 census, Tampico had a population of 467.

== History ==
The community was named Tampico by pioneer cattleman A. D. Elgin, for a town in Mexico where he once lived. Early pioneers settled in Tampico by at least 1872. By 1887, there were from 16 to 20 families living in the community.

Chief Kamiakin—who led the Yakama, Palouse, and Klickitat in the Yakima War—was born at Ahtanum Creek near Tampico in 1800. Near that site, St. Joseph's Mission was built in 1852, to be subsequently destroyed and rebuilt more than once; services are still regularly performed there.

== Demographics ==
Historical population
Census	Pop.	Note	%±
2010	312		—
2020	467		49.7%
U.S. Decennial Census; 2000 2010

Tampico first appeared as a census designated place in the 2010 U.S. census.

=== Racial and ethnic composition ===
Tampico CDP, Washington – Racial and ethnic composition Note: the US Census treats Hispanic/Latino as an ethnic category. This table excludes Latinos from the racial categories and assigns them to a separate category. Hispanics/Latinos may be of any race.
Race / Ethnicity (NH = Non-Hispanic)	Pop 2010	Pop 2020	% 2010	% 2020
White alone (NH)	274	356	87.82%	76.23%
Black or African American alone (NH)	0	1	0.00%	0.21%
Native American or Alaska Native alone (NH)	5	12	1.60%	2.57%
Asian alone (NH)	0	1	0.00%	0.21%
Native Hawaiian or Pacific Islander alone (NH)	0	1	0.00%	0.21%
Other race alone (NH)	2	3	0.64%	0.64%
Mixed race or Multiracial (NH)	11	21	3.53%	4.50%
Hispanic or Latino (any race)	20	72	6.41%	15.42%
Total	312	467	100.00%	100.00%

== Education ==
The community is served by West Valley School District 208.
