= Old Mabton High School =

- U.S. National Register of Historic Places
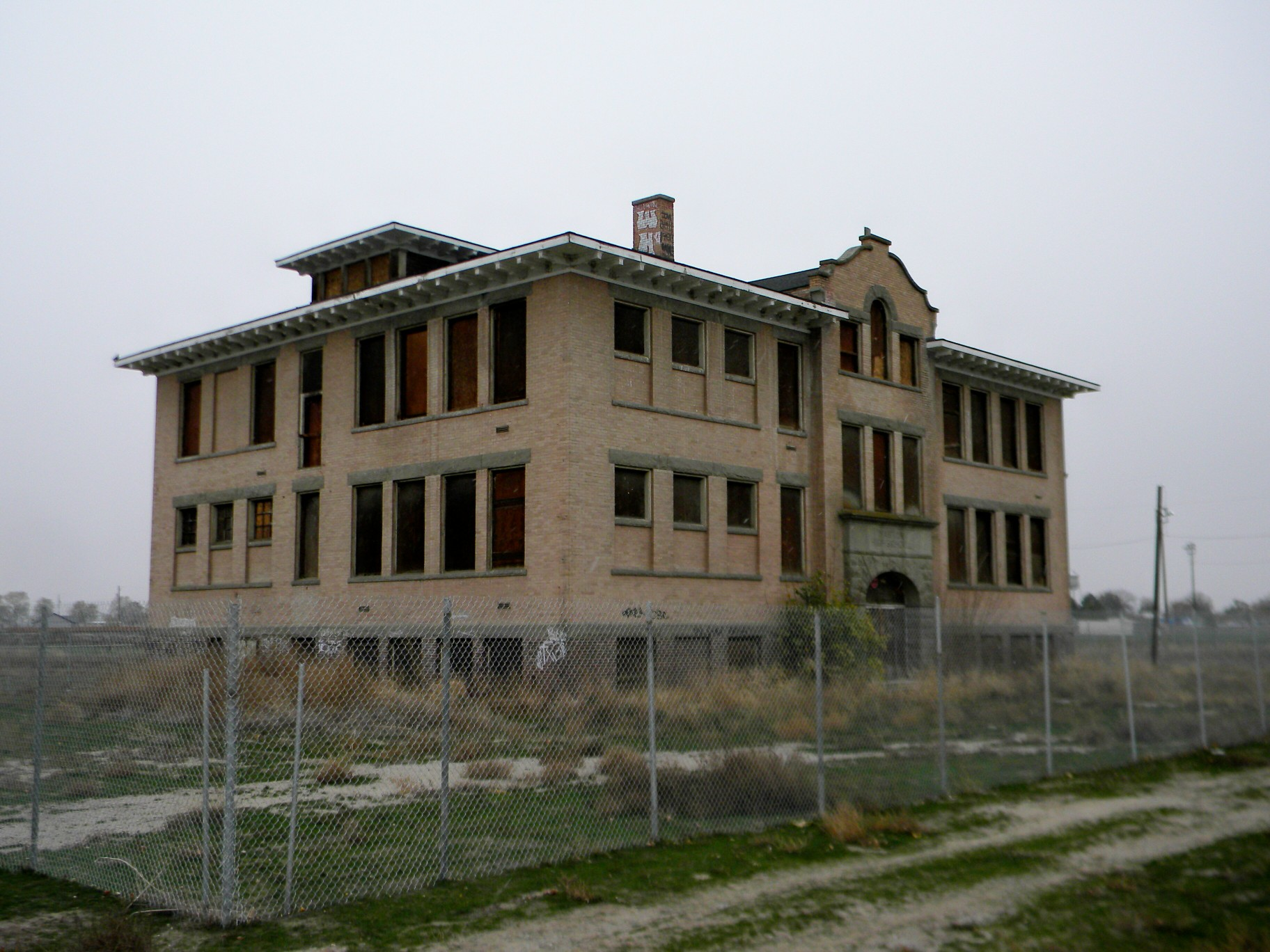
- Old Mabton High School in 2014

- Location within Washington (state)
- Location: High School Rd, Mabton, Washington
- Coordinates: 46.212222°N 119.990278°W
- Area: 2 acres (0.81 ha)
- Built: 1911
- Architect: Unknown
- Architectural style: Mission Revival
- NRHP reference No.: 85002917
- Added to NRHP: November 21, 1985

The Old Mabton High School in Mabton, Washington is a historic building constructed in 1911. The two and a half story tan brick building was built during Mabton's heyday as a center of commerce in the Yakima Valley. It was the high school for Mabton until the 1960s. It has belonged to the Mabton Historical Society since 1977. It was placed on the NHRP in 1985. The building is currently unused.
