= Elizabeth Loudon Carmichael House =

- U.S. National Register of Historic Places
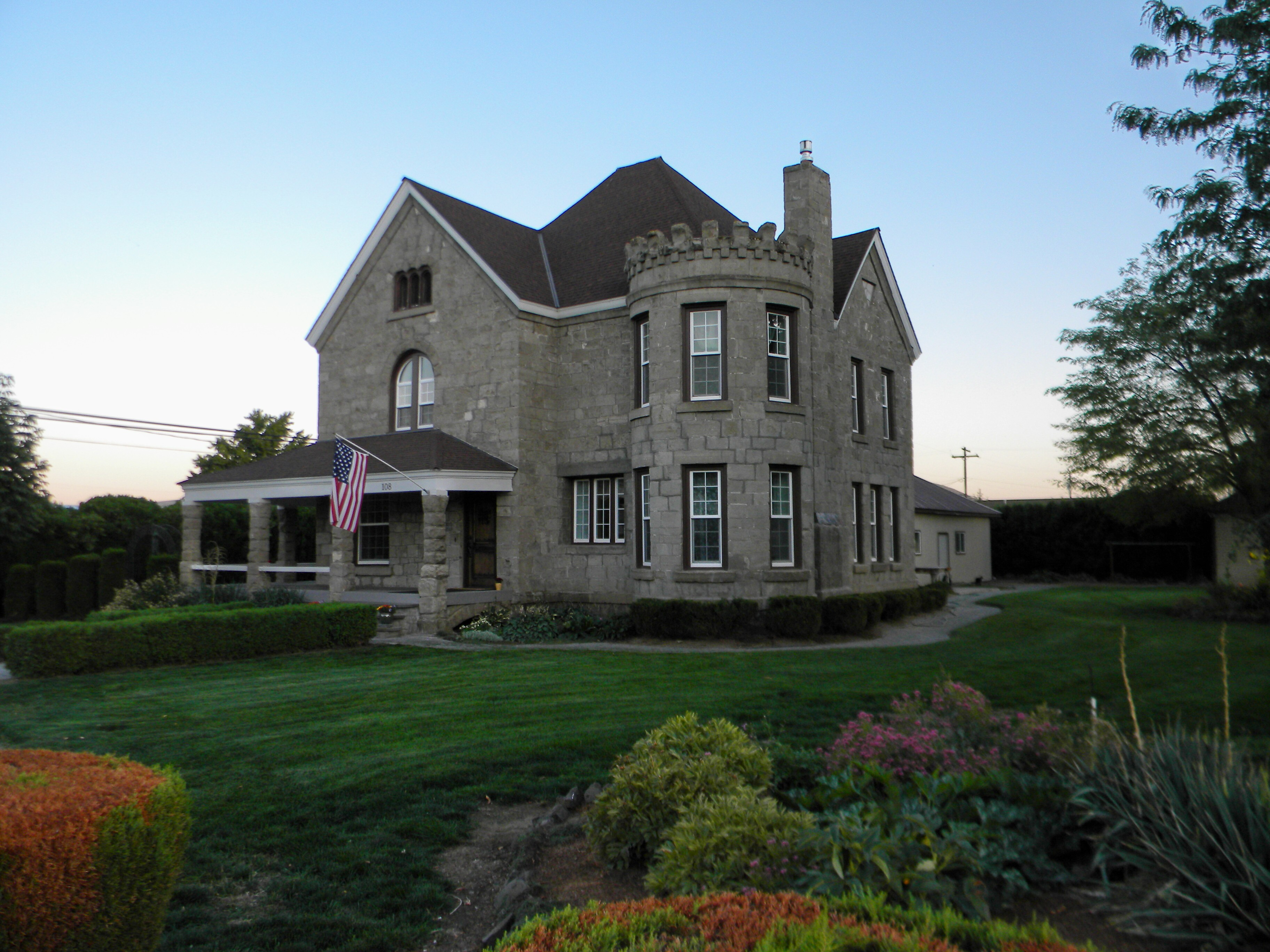
- The "Carmichael Castle"

- Location within Yakima County Location within the United States
- Location: 108 West Pine, Union Gap, Washington
- Coordinates: 46.551667°N 120.476111°W
- Area: less than one acre
- Built: 1900
- Architect: Unknown
- Architectural style: Queen Anne
- NRHP reference No.: 91000538
- Added to NRHP: May 1, 1991

The Elizabeth Loudon Carmichael House is a two and one-half story Queen Anne style residence built of masonry construction and located in Union Gap, Washington. Resting on a large corner lot in a residential neighborhood, the house is distinguished by rusticated stonework and a crenelated tower.

The home was built and occupied by the notable Yakima resident and entrepreneur Elizabeth Loudon Carmichael until 1920 (notably, she also built the Carmichael-Loudon House in Yakima, which is also listed in the National Register of Historic Places). Mrs. Carmichael was responsible for a successful mercantile store, and the establishment and expansion of the largest creamery in the Yakima area.

The house was listed in the NRHP in 1991, and is currently a private residence.
