= Ahtanum State Forest =

Forest and recreation area in Washington, U.S.

- Location within Washington (state)
- Location: Yakima County, Washington, United States
- Nearest city: Yakima, Washington
- Coordinates: 46.50788°N 120.92166°W
- Area: 75,000 acres (30,000 hectares)
- Max. elevation: 6,981 feet (2,128 m)
- Min. elevation: 3,150 feet (960 m)
- Established: 2005
- Administrator: Washington State Department of Natural Resources
- Website: https://www.dnr.wa.gov/Ahtanum

Ahtanum State Forest is a working forest and recreation area located in Yakima County, Washington. It covers approximately 75,000 acres (30,000 hectares) and lies 30 miles (48 km) west of the city of Yakima. The forest borders the Yakama Indian Reservation to the south, and the name Ahtanum means “stream by long mountain” in the Yakama language.

== History ==
The land comprising Ahtanum State Forest had previously been a checkerboard of public and private land. In 2005, the Washington State Department of Natural Resources (DNR) traded 3,000 acres (1,200 hectares) of scattered land elsewhere for 12,000 acres (4,900 hectares) of this private forest owned by two companies, Plum Creek Timber and Elk Haven Tree Farms. This "blocking up" allowed DNR to consolidate ownership of 35,000 acres (14,000 hectares) of land in order to create Ahtanum State Forest. The Rocky Mountain Elk Foundation (RMEF) paid for $50,000 worth of appraisals to help complete the land exchange after DNR ran out of money until the next funding cycle.

== Sources ==
- Landers, Rich (June 18, 2006). "Two groups take lead in land swaps". The Spokesman-Review. Spokane, Washington.
- Washington State Department of Natural Resources (2005). "Annual Report 2005" (PDF).
- Washington State Department of Natural Resources (January 2010). "Ahtanum State Forest Recreation Plan" (PDF).
- Washington State Department of Natural Resources (March 30, 2015). "Ahtanum State Forest". WA.
