= Grandview, Washington =

- City
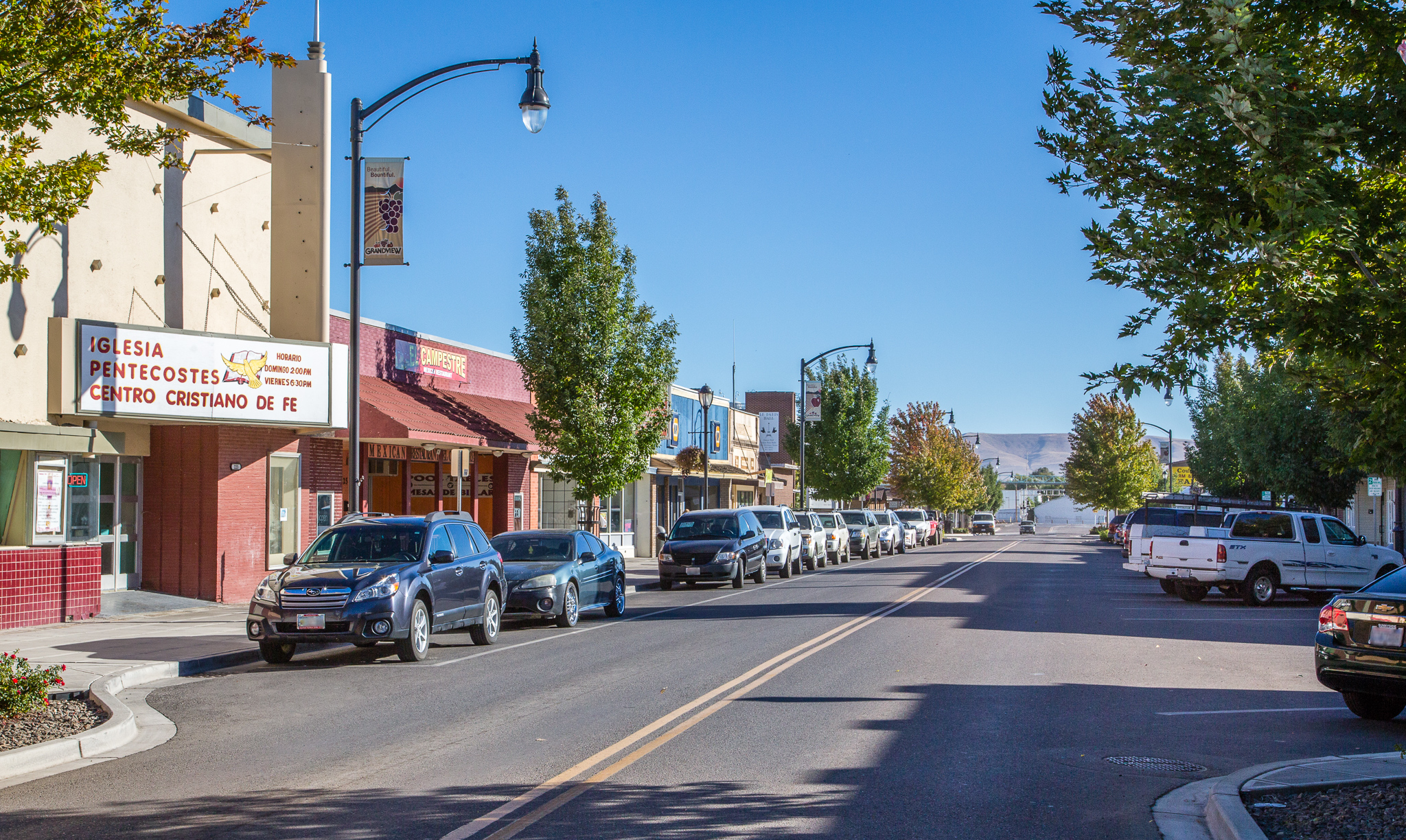
- Division St.

- Location of Grandview, Washington
- Coordinates: 46°15′13″N 119°54′36″W
- Country: United States
- State: Washington
- County: Yakima
- Incorporated: September 21, 1909

Government
  - Type: Mayor–council
  - Mayor: Ashley Lara

Area
  - Total: 6.52 sq mi (16.89 km^{2})
  - Land: 6.44 sq mi (16.68 km^{2})
  - Water: 0.081 sq mi (0.21 km^{2})
- Elevation: 820 ft (250 m)

Population (2020)
  - Total: 10,907
  - Estimate (2022): 11,043
  - Density: 1,720.2/sq mi (664.17/km^{2})
- Time zone: UTC−8 (Pacific (PST))
  - Summer (DST): UTC−7 (PDT)
- ZIP code: 98930
- Area code: 509
- FIPS code: 53-27925
- GNIS feature ID: 2410638
- Website: grandview.wa.us

Grandview is a city in Yakima County, Washington, United States. It is about 38 miles west of Kennewick and 38 miles southeast of Yakima. The population was 10,907 at the 2020 census. Grandview's economy is agriculture based, with apples, cherries, concord and wine grapes, hops, asparagus, corn, wheat, dairy and other fruit and vegetable production supported by processing plants and cold storage facilities.

== History ==
Grandview received its name from the Granger Land Company in 1905 due to its view of Mount Rainier and Mount Adams. Grandview was officially incorporated on September 21, 1909. It began simply as the halfway point on the rail line between Prosser and Sunnyside.

== Geography ==
According to the United States Census Bureau, the city has a total area of 6.31 square miles (16.34 km^{2}), of which, 6.23 square miles (16.14 km^{2}) is land and 0.08 square miles (0.21 km^{2}) is water.

== Demographics ==
Historical population
Census	Pop.	Note	%±
1910	320		—
1920	1,011		215.9%
1930	1,085		7.3%
1940	1,449		33.5%
1950	2,503		72.7%
1960	3,366		34.5%
1970	3,605		7.1%
1980	5,615		55.8%
1990	7,169		27.7%
2000	8,377		16.9%
2010	10,862		29.7%
2020	10,907		0.4%
2022 (est.)	11,043		1.2%
U.S. Decennial Census; 2020 Census

=== 2020 census ===
As of the 2020 census, Grandview had a population of 10,907. The median age was 28.6 years. 34.2% of residents were under the age of 18 and 10.1% of residents were 65 years of age or older. For every 100 females there were 98.3 males, and for every 100 females age 18 and over there were 95.3 males age 18 and over.

99.0% of residents lived in urban areas, while 1.0% lived in rural areas.

There were 3,160 households in Grandview, of which 53.5% had children under the age of 18 living in them. Of all households, 48.8% were married-couple households, 14.4% were households with a male householder and no spouse or partner present, and 24.7% were households with a female householder and no spouse or partner present. About 15.6% of all households were made up of individuals and 6.9% had someone living alone who was 65 years of age or older.

There were 3,273 housing units, of which 3.5% were vacant. The homeowner vacancy rate was 0.6% and the rental vacancy rate was 2.9%.

Racial composition as of the 2020 census
Race	Number	Percent
White	2,870	26.3%
Black or African American	37	0.3%
American Indian and Alaska Native	177	1.6%
Asian	59	0.5%
Native Hawaiian and Other Pacific Islander	4	0.0%
Some other race	5,766	52.9%
Two or more races	1,994	18.3%
Hispanic or Latino (of any race)	9,155	83.9%

=== 2010 census ===
As of the 2010 census, there were 10,862 people, 2,996 households, and 2,459 families living in the city. The population density was 1,743.5 inhabitants per square mile (673.2/km^{2}). There were 3,136 housing units at an average density of 503.4 per square mile (194.4/km^{2}). The racial makeup of the city was 55.2% White, 0.9% African American, 0.6% Native American, 0.5% Asian, 0.1% Pacific Islander, 38.8% from other races, and 4.0% from two or more races. Hispanic or Latino of any race were 79.7% of the population.

There were 2,996 households, of which 57.1% had children under the age of 18 living with them, 54.5% were married couples living together, 18.5% had a female householder with no husband present, 9.0% had a male householder with no wife present, and 17.9% were non-families. 14.2% of all households were made up of individuals, and 5.6% had someone living alone who was 65 years of age or older. The average household size was 3.60 and the average family size was 3.90.

The median age in the city was 26.3 years. 37% of residents were under the age of 18; 11.2% were between the ages of 18 and 24; 26.8% were from 25 to 44; 17.1% were from 45 to 64; and 7.9% were 65 years of age or older. The gender makeup of the city was 50.0% male and 50.0% female.

=== 2000 census ===
As of the 2000 census, there were 8,377 people, 2,431 households, and 1,956 families living in the city. The population density was 1,552.3 people per square mile (599.0/km^{2}). There were 2,581 housing units at an average density of 478.3 per square mile (184.5/km^{2}). The racial makeup of the city was 51.12% White, 0.58% African American, 0.94% Native American, 0.94% Asian, 0.11% Pacific Islander, 43.27% from other races, and 3.03% from two or more races. Hispanic or Latino of any race were 68.04% of the population.

There were 2,431 households, out of which 49.9% had children under the age of 18 living with them, 60.0% were married couples living together, 14.6% had a female householder with no husband present, and 19.5% were non-families. 16.6% of all households were made up of individuals, and 7.8% had someone living alone who was 65 years of age or older. The average household size was 3.40 and the average family size was 3.80.

In the city, the age distribution of the population shows 36.2% under the age of 18, 11.3% from 18 to 24, 27.0% from 25 to 44, 16.1% from 45 to 64, and 9.4% who were 65 years of age or older. The median age was 27 years. For every 100 females, there were 98.5 males. For every 100 females age 18 and over, there were 96.6 males.

The median income for a household in the city was $32,588, and the median income for a family was $36,165. Males had a median income of $29,321 versus $21,959 for females. The per capita income for the city was $12,489. About 16.0% of families and 20.3% of the population were below the poverty line, including 26.0% of those under age 18 and 17.6% of those age 65 or over.

== Notable people ==
- Lorena González, Seattle city councilmember
- Gloria Mendoza, mayor of Grandview
- Margaret Rayburn, educator and member of the Washington House of Representatives
- Janet Waldo, voice-over actress

== Major highways ==
- Interstate 82
