= Eileen M. Bulger =

American surgeon

- Education: Johns Hopkins University (BS) Cornell University Medical College (MD)
- Occupations: Surgeon, Professor
- Years active: 2000-Present
- Medical career
- Institutions: University of Washington; Harborview Medical Center
- Website: www.uwmedicine.org/bios/eileen-bulger#about-tab

Eileen M. Bulger is an American surgeon who is the Chief of Trauma at Harborview Medical Center and Professor of Surgery at University of Washington.

== Education ==
Bulger received her undergraduate degree from Johns Hopkins University before graduating from Cornell University Medical College in 1992 with her MD. Afterward, she completed her residency in general surgery at the University of Washington, where she remained to complete a fellowship in critical care medicine. Bulger is double board certified in surgery and surgical critical care by the American Board of Surgery.

== Career ==
Bulger was appointed the Chair of the American College of Surgeons Committee on Trauma in 2018. Currently Bulger is the chief of Trauma, Burns, and Critical Care at University of Washington. Dr. Bulger carries the position Surgeon-in-Chief at Harborview Medical Center as well. Bulger served as President of the American Association for the Surgery of Trauma (AAST) in 2022–2023. Bulger is currently the Chair of the American College of Surgens Committee on Trauma.

== Research ==
Bulger's research is focused on novel ways to treat the injured, streamlining prehospital care, testing new approaches to necrotizing soft tissue infections, and developing a National Trauma Research action plan for the United States. Her research has been funded by the National Institutes of Health, the United States Department of Defense, and Medic One Foundation. Bulger previously had made research advances as co-investigator at Resuscitation Outcomes Consortium and as investigator at Seattle Crash Injury Research and Engineering Center.

Bulger has published 359 peer-reviewed articles.
