= White Center COVID-19 quarantine site =

COVID-19 quarantine site in Washington, United States

Coordinates: 47°30′12″N 122°20′12″W

The White Center COVID-19 quarantine site was a quarantine site in the unincorporated King County neighborhood of White Center, near Seattle, Washington, in the United States. Residents who were diagnosed with COVID-19 but could not be quarantined at home, but who did not need emergency medical care, were housed there. Many of them were expected to be the homeless.

The facility was funded by Public Health – Seattle & King County as part of a $28 million emergency spending package. The plan was announced on March 3 and the first trailer was installed there on the same day. There was space for 32 people to be housed in eight trailers. By March 27, the trailers had plumbing and were ready for use.

Senator Joe Nguyen, who represents White Center in the Washington State Legislature, said he was "wary to see that this facility has been placed in a community already deeply disenfranchised by decades of policies working against it".

The White Center facility was one of five quarantine sites in King County by the end of March, with others in Kent, Issaquah, North Seattle, and one adjacent to Harborview hospital in Seattle.
