= Emergency operations centers in Washington =

The U.S. state of Washington has several emergency operations centers (EOCs).

== Federal ==
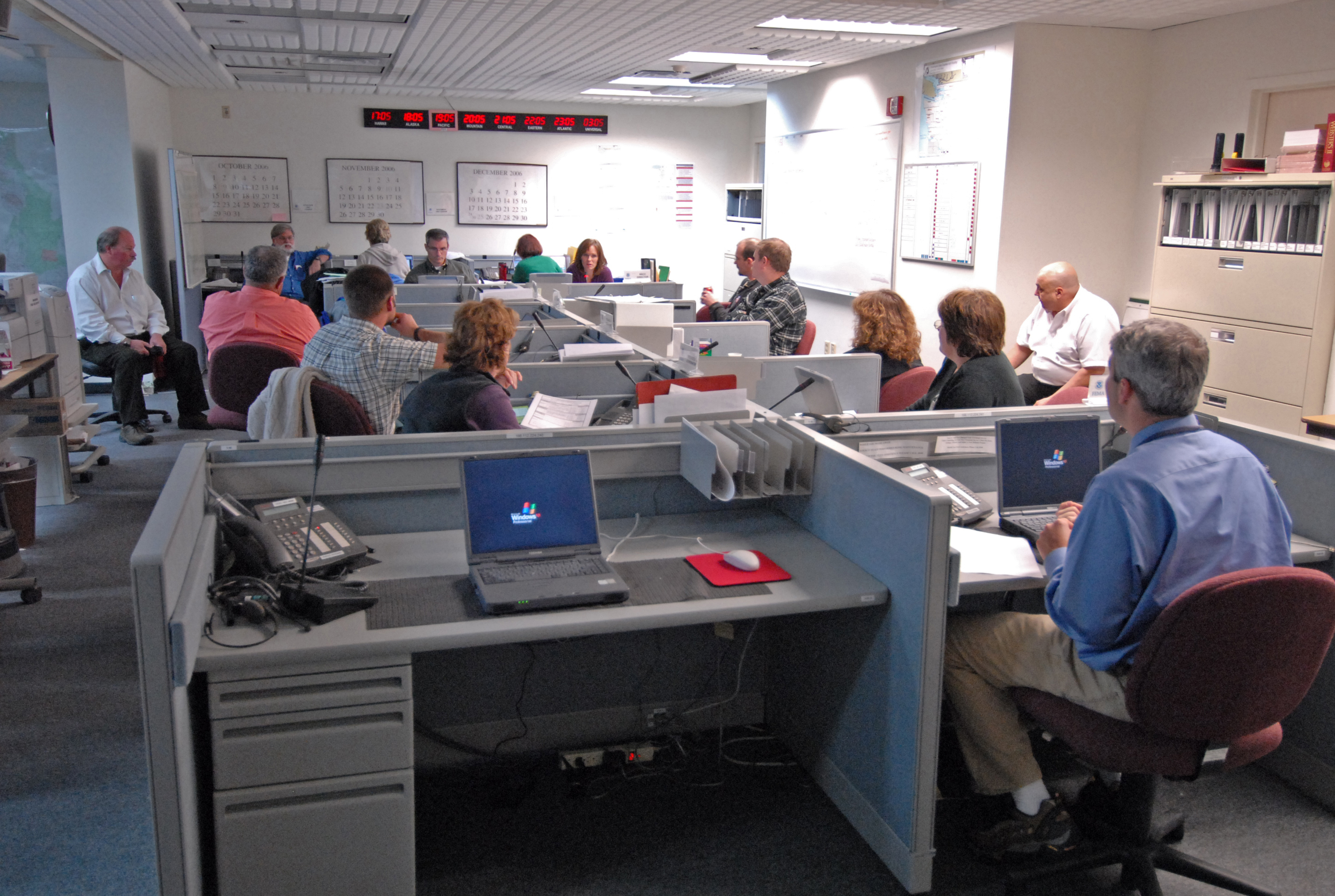
FEMA Region X Regional Response Coordination Center in Bothell

- Federal Emergency Management Agency (FEMA) Region X Regional Response Coordination Center, Bothell (underground)
- U.S. Army Corps of Engineers Emergency Operations Center, Seattle District
- U.S. Department of Energy Hanford Emergency Operations Center, Hanford Nuclear Reservation

== State ==
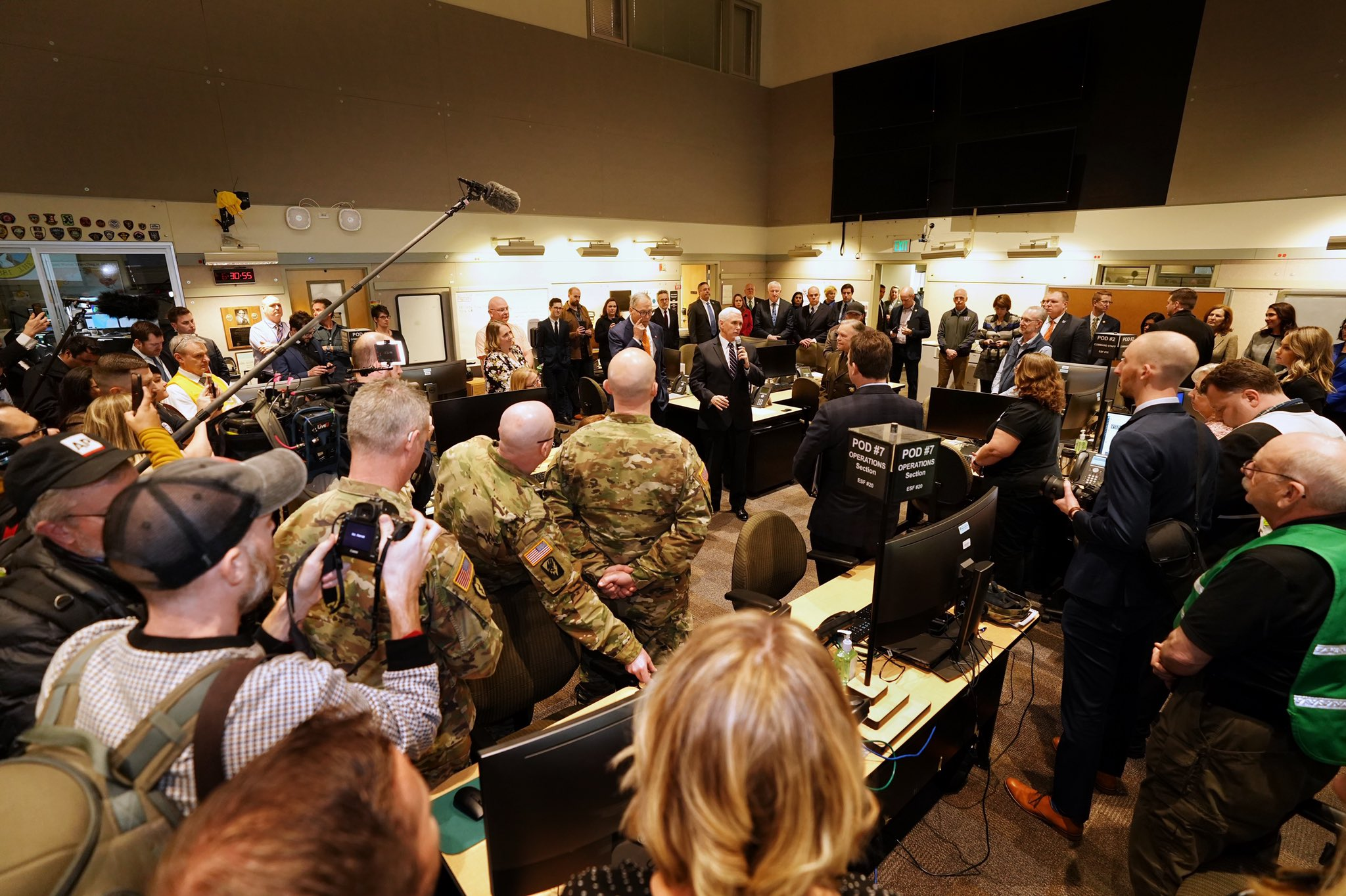
United States Vice President Mike Pence at Washington State Emergency Operations Center during the 2020 coronavirus pandemic

- Washington State Emergency Operations Center, Camp Murray, Lakewood

== County ==
- Benton County EOC, Richland (Note: covers the Hanford Nuclear Reservation, Columbia Generating Station nuclear reactors, and Umatilla Chemical Depot incidents)
- Franklin County EOC, Port of Pasco (Note: covers the Hanford Nuclear Reservation and Columbia Generating Station nuclear reactors)
- Grays Harbor County Emergency Coordination Center, Montesano (Note: Includes Quinault Indian Nation and Chehalis Tribe sovereigns within the borders of Grays Harbor County)
- King County EOC, Renton
- Pacific County EOC, South Bend (Note: Level 1 activation March 16, 2020 for the 2020 coronavirus pandemic in Washington (state))
- Snohomish County EOC, Everett (Note: Everett or alternate facility or mobile EOC designated for continuity of operations)
- Spokane Emergency Coordination Center, Spokane
- Tacoma-Pierce County EOC, Tacoma
- Walla Walla EOC, Walla Walla (Note: Designated primary location with two secondary locations, all in the city of Walla Walla)

== Local ==
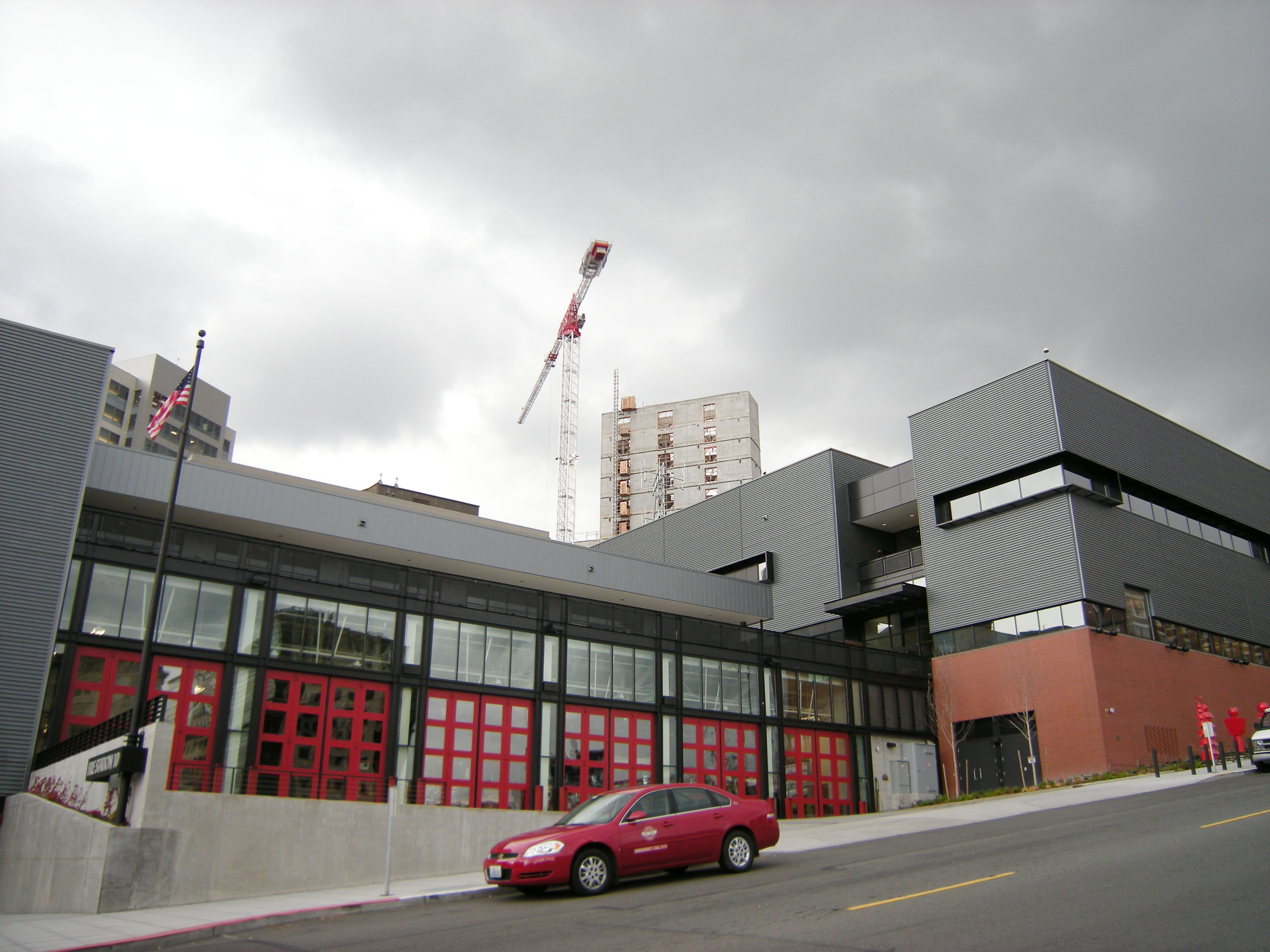
Fire Station 10 and Seattle EOC

- City of Kirkland Emergency Operations Center, basement of City Hall
- City of Seattle Emergency Operations Center, co-located with Fire Station 10, 5th Avenue, Seattle

== Other ==
- University of Washington EOC, UW Tower, Seattle (Note: Primary location at UW Tower with backup location and mobile EOC)
