= Institute for Disease Modeling =

Institute for Disease Modeling (IDM) is an institute within the Global Health Division of the Bill and Melinda Gates Foundation. Established in 2008 as part of the Global Good Fund, a non-profit subsidiary of Intellectual Ventures (IV) funded by Bill and Melinda Gates, IDM has transitioned in mid-2020 to the Gates Foundation.

IDM specializes in mathematical modelling of infectious disease and other quantitative global health research. Its models include malaria, polio, measles, COVID-19 and HIV (with EMOD). IDM releases source code of their stable models to the public. While at IV, the institute was located in Bellevue, Washington. After the outbreak of COVID-19 in Washington State, IDM has transitioned to all-remote work with no physical offices. It will eventually relocate to the Gates Foundation's main office in Seattle.

== Disease modeling software ==
EMOD is the group's individual-based disease modeling software (not a compartmental model) initially coded c. 2005. It has been released to the public as open-source software. The software can model malaria, HIV, tuberculosis, measles, dengue, polio and typhoid.

In 2020, IDM developed a designated COVID-19 agent-based model named "Covasim." It was used initially to advise on decision-making during the COVID-19 pandemic in Oregon and in Washington State, gaining national attention. Covasim, coded in Python, is open-source and has been used by independent researchers around the world.
