= Public Health – Seattle & King County =

Public Health — Seattle & King County

Agency overview
- Formed: 1951
- Preceding agencies: Seattle Department of Health; King County Department of Health
- Type: Public Health Department
- Jurisdiction: King County, Washington
- Headquarters: 401 5th Avenue, Seattle, Washington
- Employees: 1,600
- Annual budget: $ 318 Million
- Agency executive: Sandra J. Valenciano, MD, MPH, Health Officer and Interim Director for Public Health
- Parent agency: Government of King County; Government of the City of Seattle
- Website: https://www.kingcounty.gov/health

Public Health – Seattle & King County (PHSKC) is the public health department in King County, Washington, United States. It is jointly managed by the City of Seattle and King County governments, serving approximately 2.3 million residents. Some of its services include King County Medic One, overdose prevention and response, online restaurant inspections, emergency preparedness, sexual health services.

== History of the Department ==
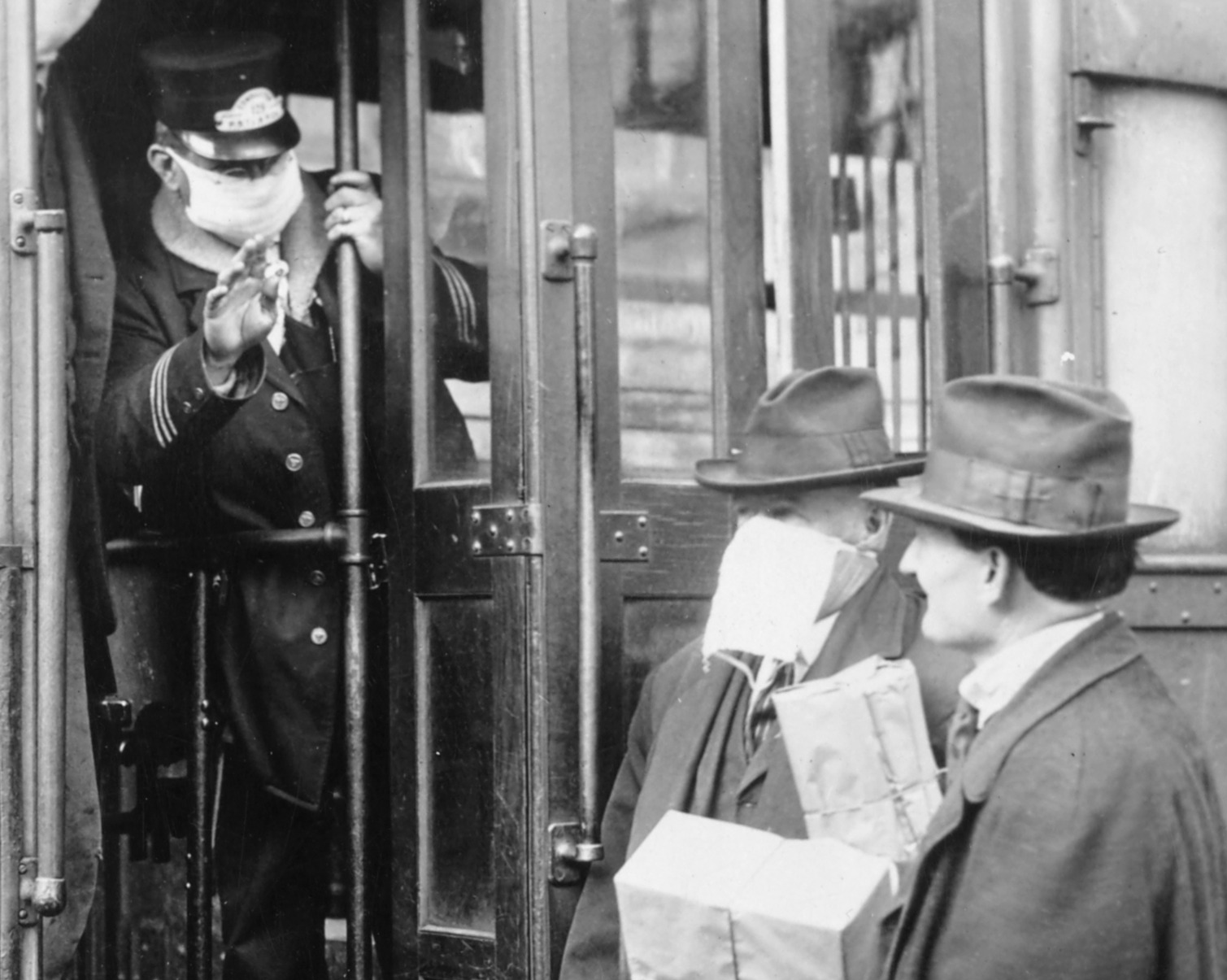
Facemasks were required to use Seattle streetcars during the Spanish flu epidemic of 1918.

The Seattle City Council created the position of city Health Officer in 1877. The Health Officer had the responsibility to abate nuisances affecting the public health and to prevent the spread of contagious disease, especially smallpox. Between 1877 and 1890, ten different local doctors served in the role. In 1890, the city established a Department of Sanitation, under the direction of the Board of Health, which also authority to appoint a Health Officer. It was badly needed. That year "[t]here were so many cases of typhoid fever that the health officer could not investigate them all" and "hogs with cholera were being sold for human consumption." From 1891, there was also a Market Inspector, under the supervision of the Health Officer. An amended City Charter in 1908 replaced the Board of Health with a new Department of Health, with a Commissioner of Health appointed by the Mayor. At that time, problems were still quite severe: a federal government expert wrote, "Seldom have I seen worse conditions among dairies than in those here."

In 1915, Seattle could claim that its death rate, of 7.44 per thousand, was the lowest of any city of its size in the world. Still, in 1916 there were numerous cases of poisoning from bad chickens and fish. In that era, the department focused in large measure on quarantine for infectious diseases and had a special division to deal with tuberculosis, including a special tuberculosis hospital, Firland Tuberculosis Hospital (founded as Henry Sanatorium in 1911 by Seattle millionaire and philanthropist Horace Chapin Henry). (Appeared as "The Pines Sanatarium" in Betty MacDonald's THE PLAGUE & I. Health inspections were required for all people engaged in food preparation, as were general physicals for drivers of vehicles for hire. A child welfare division was empowered to inspect any home where children were being raised, and also could provide poor families with free milk. There was also a focus on preventing bubonic plague from entering through the city's port. The city also operated several free medical services, including a small emergency hospital for the indigent and free typhoid shots for anyone travelling out of the city to a region where typhoid might be encountered.

Another key function was safety of the food supply: at this date, the federal government had no involvement in the safety of the food supply, except insofar as goods were shipped across state lines. The city health department not only engaged in restaurant and market inspections (which by this time included Pike Place Market, established 1907), but also oversaw the health of the city's farm animals, especially milk cows, but also chickens and horses. In 1915, the department ordered 88,594 pounds (40,186 kg) of meat destroyed as unfit for human consumption. Dairy rankings were published in the daily paper to encourage competition in keeping standards high.

From 1912, garbage collection became a city function, initially utilizing a mix of landfill burial, incineration, and dumping from scows.

The Seattle Department of Health continued in this form until 1951, when it merged with the King County Department of Health. Until 1981, the City of Seattle administered the department; the city and the rest of the county each provided funding proportionate to their populations. Since 1981, the department is under county administration; the City retains direct policy and funding control over the Seattle Services Division.
