= Harborview Medical Center =

Hospital in Seattle, Washington, U.S.

- UW Medicine
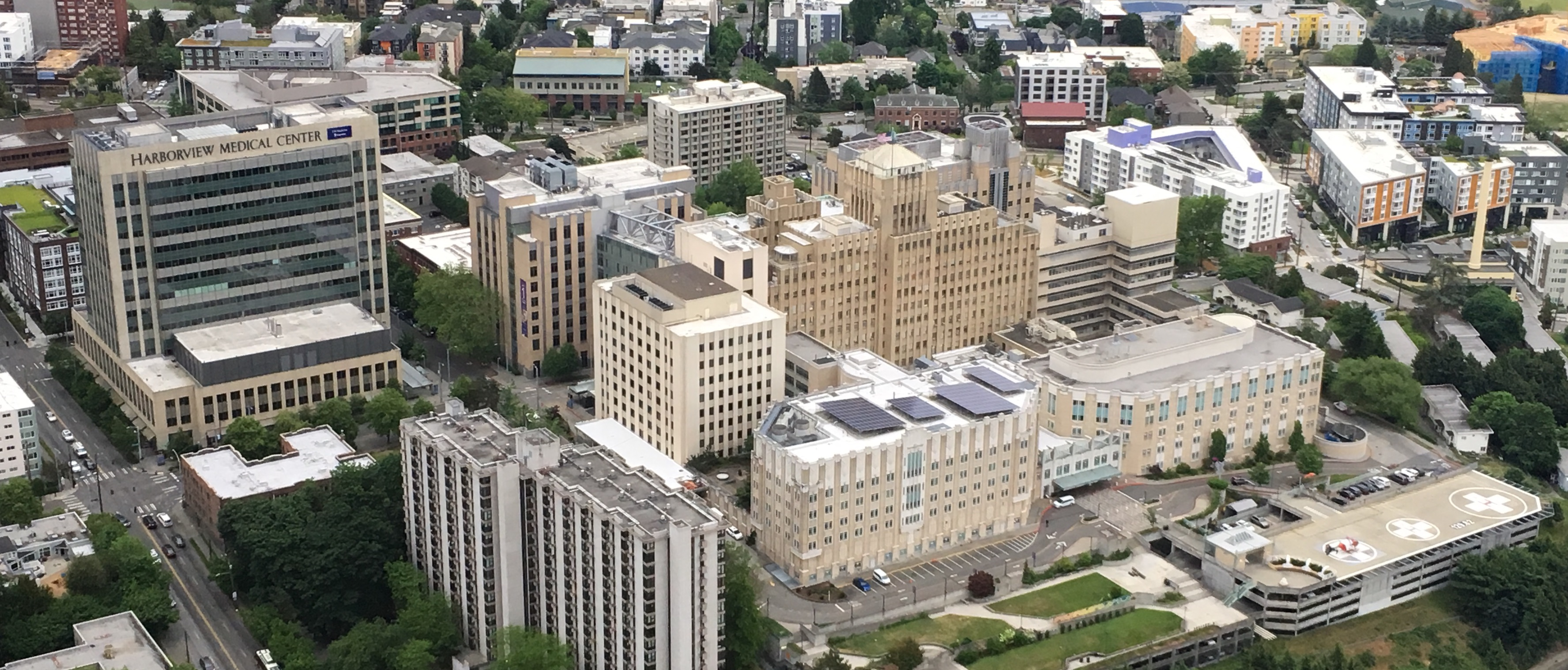
- Harborview Medical Center as viewed from Columbia Center, in 2019

Geography
- Location: 325 Ninth Avenue; Seattle, Washington, U.S.
- Coordinates: 47.60396°N 122.32435°W

Organisation
- Care system: Public, Medicaid, Medicare
- Type: Teaching
- Affiliated university: University of Washington
- Network: University of Washington Medicine

Services
- Emergency department: Level I Adult Trauma Center / Level I Pediatric Trauma Center
- Beds: 540

Helipads
- Helipad: Aeronautical chart and airport information for WA53 at SkyVector

History
- Founded: 1877

Links
- Website: uwmedicine.org/hmc
- Lists: Hospitals in U.S.
- Other links: List of hospitals in Washington (state)

Harborview Medical Center is a public hospital located in the First Hill neighborhood of Seattle, Washington, United States. It is owned by King County and managed by UW Medicine.

== Overview ==
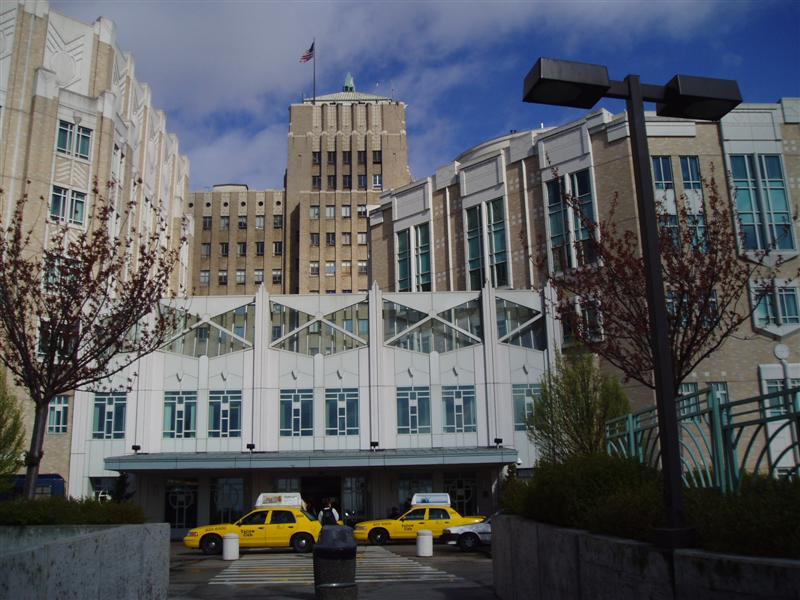
Front entrance of Harborview Medical Center

Harborview Medical Center is the designated Disaster Control Hospital for Seattle and King County, on account of it having the only Level I adult and pediatric trauma and burn center in Washington state; it also serves the states of Alaska, Idaho, and Montana. Harborview's burn center is one of the largest in the United States, specializing in pioneering treatments including the use of artificial skin products, which have significantly reduced mortality rates for severely burned patients.

Harborview's Center for Sexual Assault provides medical and counseling services for victims of sexual assault and their families. Thousands of patients are treated each year in the Neurosurgery Department for disorders of the brain, spinal cord, and peripheral nerves, such as head and spinal cord injuries, stroke, brain tumors, degenerative disc disease, and spinal disc herniations. The hospital's orthopedics service has been listed as one of the top 10 services of its kind in the country by U.S. News & World Report. As of fiscal year 2007, Harborview's operating budget was $568 million and its income from operations was $585 million.

Harborview was instrumental in establishing Medic One, one of the country's first paramedic response programs. Many of Washington state's emergency medical service technicians are trained at the hospital. Harborview is also the principal clinical site for the University of Washington's center for AIDS research. The Madison Clinic, Harborview's outpatient facility, is the largest single provider of AIDS care in King County.

== History ==
The hospital was founded in 1877 as King County Hospital, a six-bed welfare hospital in a two-story south Seattle building. By 1906, it had moved into a new building in Georgetown, with room for 225 patients. Another move occurred in 1931, when the center wing of the present hospital on First Hill was completed, and the hospital's name was changed to Harborview.

Harborview's Center for Sexual Assault and Traumatic Stress was established in 1973.

In 2020, a $1.74 billion bond measure was approved by voters in King County to expand and modernize Harborview Medical Center. The project includes seismic retrofitting of existing buildings and a new 10-story building with 360 single-bed rooms, a helipad, and more modern facilities.

== In popular media ==
Harborview is the subject of Audrey Young's book House of Hope and Fear, and the Mark Lanegan song "Harborview Hospital".

In the 2005 ABC medical drama Grey's Anatomy, Seattle Grace Hospital was based on Harborview Medical Center. It is also in the television show Private Practice, a Grey's Anatomy spinoff. Over the course of Grey's Anatomy, there were two other hospital names in the same hospital based on Harborview, Seattle Grace Mercy West Hospital, and Grey Sloan Memorial Hospital.

Harborview also appears in the two-hour special "Most Deadly Passage" of the series Emergency!, where main characters John Gage and Roy DeSoto visit Seattle to see how the paramedics of the Seattle Fire Department handle their calls compared to the ones Gage and DeSoto deal with back in Los Angeles County.

Harborview serves as the inspiration for Lakehill Hospital in the 2020 video game The Last of Us Part II, which takes place largely in Seattle.

== Notable faculty ==
Paul Ramsey, MD, served as Harborview's chief executive officer from 1997 to 2022.
