= Lake Forest Sanitarium =

Coordinates: 47.7539°N 122.3137°W

Lake Forest Sanatorium

Geography
- Location: Shoreline, Washington, United States

History
- Founded: 1942
- Closed: 1943

Links
- Lists: Hospitals in Washington state

The Lake Forest Sanitarium, also known as the Lake Forest Park Sanatorium, was a sanatorium located in Shoreline, Washington. The sanatorium was located at 15th Ave NE and NE 172nd St. The structure was destroyed by a fire in 1943 that killed 32 patients.

== History ==
In 1928, Dr. William C. Parfitt bought the log cabin, which was the original central part of the structure. Over the years, several wooden additions were added to the building. Parfitt originally wanted to run the building as a sanatorium but elected to sell the structure in October 1942 to Marjorie Westberg. Westberg opened the building as a privately run sanatorium shortly following the purchase. It served a mix of patients, such as the elderly, disabled or those who suffered from mental health conditions.

On January 31, 1943, at about 12:20 p.m, a fire broke out on the lower floor of the south wing of the sanatorium. The fire was started by a 37 year old plumber named Maurice R. Baird after lighting a match. The head of the match flew off and fell between the body and the shell of the stove that Baird was working on, igniting it. Baird first ran out of the room to acquire water to throw on the flames, which caused the fire to grow. Baird then attempted to smother the flames with a rug but was unsuccessful, and the fire spread from the oven to the wall. Baird then located a fire extinguisher, but when he returned to the room with the stove, it was already completely engulfed in flames. He was able to help rescue a small number of people with assistance of others; Jack Mullen, Lou Monroe, and Bud Colvin, who lived across from the sanatorium. Barbara Mullen, the 12-year-old daughter of Jack Mullen, also assisted in rescuing patients. She pushed a woman out in a wheelchair and wheeled a man out of the building in his hospital bed. One of the survivors that the group rescued was 78 year old Mary Perry, who was blind. Perry was rescued after another patient insisted she was rescued before her.

Baird had been hired by Westberg on January 30 to connect the stove to an oil tank outside, as the previous method of heating up the stove was to fill up the stove with oil inside the house. Westberg had requested service from Baird after a small fire had broken out while she was filling the stove within a week of the fire that destroyed the building. Westberg had been able to contain the previous fire with a fire extinguisher before it got out of control. At the time of the fire, Mrs. Westberg was not on the premises, as she was buying medicine for patients in the nearby Lake City neighborhood.

The first engine arrived on the scene about 5 minutes after the alarm sounded. This engine was run by the Lake Forest fire department. Firefighters also arrived from the Seattle Naval Hospital to assist with putting out the fire. By the time firefighters had arrived, a majority of the interior of the building was on fire and the roof had already collapsed. They were unable to rescue any survivors. Initial reports on the fire put the death count at 30, with an 86-year-old woman named Rose Ayersman missing. An additional man named Alfred Smith was found dead in the rubble. Both bodies were found on February 3, 1943. In total, 32 of the 49 patients died; another 10 patients were injured, with only 7 unharmed from the fire. Patients who were injured were taken to Harborview Medical Center and the Seattle Naval Hospital for treatment. The fire was the worst disaster to take place in a sanatorium in Washington state. It was the second worst disaster to take place in King County at the time, the first being the Wellington avalanche in 1910 that killed 96 people.

== Aftermath ==
After the fire, the building was demolished, as a majority of the structure had been destroyed. An inquest was held into the safety of the sanatorium. During the inquest, Westberg claimed that the oil that caused the fire was not there before Baird started working on the furnace. Baird countered this by claiming there was oil already present, claiming that oil from previous fillings of the stove dripped down between the interior of the stove and the outer casing. Westberg claimed the fire extinguishers were checked 3 weeks before the fire.

A number of factors were attributed to the high death count. The structure itself was built of flammable materials, with the main material being wood. Many of the patients were elderly and unable to walk, leaving them bedbound as the fire spread. Other patients with some mobility were unable to get to their mobility aids before the fire overtook them. The sanatorium was also severely understaffed, with one nurse and one dishwasher for 49 patients. Staff were also not drilled in what to do in a fire or trained on how to use fire extinguishers. The building had 3 exits, but no exit in the south wing where the fire broke out. Firefighting and police efforts were hampered by a crowd gathering around the fire.

Baird was charged with incompetence in his role starting the fire and as a repairman. It was found Baird was unprepared to handle a grease fire. Before the fire, Baird had never worked on an oil stove. Baird was also only a part time repairman, also working as a postman. Westberg was charged with negligence as the sanatorium owner, with the jury citing the condition of the building, number of patients, lack of staff, and lack of fire safety training in their ruling.

A safety review of other sanatoriums in the area such as Firland Sanatorium was undertaken in fear that a similar disaster could take place. Fire chiefs from seven departments in northern King County also started the voluntary inspections of sanatoriums, hospitals, and nursing homes in the area.

Following the fire, legislation was passed by the Washington state legislature requiring quarterly sanitary and fire inspections at places of refuge, such as sanitariums, nursing homes, and hospitals. This legislation, proposed as Senate Substitute Bill 105, was passed unanimously by the state senate on February 5, 1943, six days after the fire occurred. The state house passed the bill a month later and it was signed into law by Governor Arthur Langlie on March 9.
