= Aldercrest Sanatorium =

Former tuberculosis sanatorium in Snohomish, Washington, U.S.

Geography
- Location: 1705 Terrace Ave, Snohomish, Washington, United States
- Coordinates: 47°56′6″N 122°4′56″W

Organization
- Type: Sanatorium

Services
- Beds: 40+

History
- Founded: 1918
- Closed: 1954

Links
- Lists: Hospitals in Washington state

Aldercrest Sanatorium was a former tuberculosis sanatorium located in Snohomish, Washington, United States. The sanatorium was opened in 1918 and closed in 1954.

== History ==
Construction on the facility began in 1917. The architects were Lundberg & Mahon, who were based out of Tacoma. The sanatorium was the second county run sanatorium built in Washington State, with the first being Mountain View Sanatorium in Pierce County in 1914. A dedication ceremony for the sanatorium took place in the administration building on February 26, 1918. The ceremony had multiple speakers, including the president of the Washington anti-tuberculosis league.

The facility officially opened on March 1, 1918. Construction and furnishing of the hospital cost around $30,000. The campus consisted of three buildings; a two story administrative building, one male ward and one female ward. Each ward could initially treat 20 patients for a total of 40. On opening, the medical director was Leon G. Woodford and the nurse superintendent was Grace L. Holmes. Holmes was formally superintendent at Edgecliff Hospital before moving to Aldercrest.

In 1922, the average stay at the sanatorium was 6 months. In 1947, Cordia Maddox was named the director of rehabilitation. From 1944 to 1946, John Fountain was named acting medical director of the sanatorium. In 1948, Cora O. Phibbs took over as occupational therapy and rehabilitation director. By 1953, the hospital had 61 patients.

Aldercrest was closed on April 30, 1954. The remaining patients were moved to Firland Sanatorium in Seattle.

== Post-Closure ==
On May 2, 1955, the buildings of the sanatorium were put to auction by the county. In 1959, the facility was purchased and opened as a nursing home named Delta Rehabilitation Center. In 1975, the facility shifted to caring for patients with severe brain injury.

In 2020, Delta Rehab closed due to cuts in Medicare funding. By 2022, the former sanatorium was demolished and developed into a housing development named the Walsh Hills Subdivison.
