= Central Washington Tuberculosis Hospital =

Former tuberculosis sanatorium and hospital in Selah, Washington

Coordinates: 46.6614°N 120.5367°W

Geography
- Location: Selah, Washington, United States

Organization
- Funding: Public hospital
- Type: Sanatorium

Services
- Beds: 153+

History
- Opened: 1950
- Closed: 1958

Links
- Lists: Hospitals in Washington state

Central Washington Tuberculosis Hospital is a former tuberculosis sanatorium located in Selah, Washington, United States. The sanatorium opened in 1950 and closed in 1958. Since 1958, the facility now operates as the Yakima Valley School, a state run nursing home for the severely developmentally disabled.

== Central Washington Tuberculosis Hospital (1950–1958) ==
Discussions to open a tuberculosis sanatorium in Central Washington began taking place as early as 1937. Formal plans to build the sanatorium began to take place in 1945. In October 1945, the counties of Yakima, Benton, Franklin, Klickitat, Kittitas, and Grant counties sent an application to the state government for $650,000 in funds to build the facility, which was approved by the state legislature. By late 1946, the estimated cost to build the hospital had been raised to $1,500,000. By May 1947, the price of building the sanatorium was raised to $3,000,000. These plans were rejected by the state legislature for being too costly, and the price was lowered to $2,000,000 by July 1947.

Plans for the building were prepared by Seattle-based architect John W. Maloney. The contract to build the hospital was awarded to the Central Construction Company of Seattle for $1,726,280. Construction of the sanatorium began on October 24, 1947. A formal dedication ceremony to open the hospital took place on January 14, 1950. On opening, the hospital had 110 beds. The first 13 patients admitted to the hospital were moved from the Yakima Valley Santorium on January 20, 1950. On opening, the medical director was Albert Robert Allen, who remained the director for the hospital's duration. In April 1950, Dr. Lawrence Lowell was named assistant medical director to Dr. Allen. Lowell had previously served as the medical director of the Seward Sanatorium in Seward, Alaska. By August 1950, the hospital had 124 patients. In the same month, the hospital board of directors signed a contract with the Department of Veterans Affairs to provide 10 beds to veterans suffering from tuberculosis. On August 20, 1950, Dr. Albert J. Bicunas of New York started his position as assistant medical director. On December 12, 1950, the hospital's boiler exploded and caused serious damage to parts of the hospital. The explosion was felt on the main floor. No one was injured as a result.

By March 1951, the hospital had 151 patients and was operating over capacity. The hospital originally had 110 single beds, but the rooms were converted to double bedrooms to try to combat the increased patient load. A majority of these patients were from Yakima County. By the end of 1951, death rates from tuberculosis in Yakima County had dropped from 23.4 per 100,000 people in 1949 to 11.4 per 100,000 people in 1951. This rate was lower than the state average, which was 12.7 per 100,000 people in the same year. Dr. Allen attributed this drop to the opening of the Central Washington Tuberculosis Hospital and the modern treatments and facilities they were able to provide patients.

In March 1952, the hospital entered into an informal agreement with the Bureau of Indian Affairs to care for Native American patients from the Chumash Indian Hospital in Tacoma. In September of the same year, the hospital cancelled its contract with the Department of Veterans Affairs due to conflict over finances. By October 1952, the hospital had 157 patients. In order to combat overpopulation, 8 patients were moved to other sanatoriums across the state.

By 1953, the average case load was between 130 and 160 patients per month. The cost of treatment each day was $8.13 per patient. In December of the same year, the hospital had 20 patients under the age of 13.

In 1954, the Washington State Health Department began consolidating tuberculosis sanatoriums due to dropping patient numbers. From January to November 1953, state tuberculosis hospitals saw a 22% drop in bed occupancy. In March of the same year, the patient load was 103. In April, this number dropped to 95, leaving 65 empty beds. As a result, the hospital closed the fourth floor to patients. In November, the patient load dropped again to 80. The hospital took in seriously ill patients from Blue Mountain Sanatorium in Walla Walla, Washington, when it closed on December 1, 1954.

The hospital closed officially on January 1, 1958. The remaining patients were moved to Firlands Sanatorium in Seattle and Edgecliff Sanatorium in Spokane by December 1957. Firlands Sanatorium also purchased the remaining hospital supplies.

=== Treatments ===
In 1950, the hospital began testing the effectiveness of cortisone as one of the treatments of tuberculosis under the direction of Dr. Allen. While cortisone was unable to stop the disease from spreading, it was found that it provided some pain relief and lowered fevers in patients. However, when given the treatment some patients experienced nervousness and tingling. Allen shared the results of the tests at the hospital with the annual Washington Tuberculosis Association meeting on June 23, 1951.

Starting on June 1, 1952, all new patients admitted to the hospital were given a treatment of antibiotic drugs under the direction of Dr. Allen. These drugs were Streptomycin, Aminosalicylic acid, and Isonicotinic acid hydrazide, which were given orally by pill or by injection. At this point in historical treatments for tuberculosis in the United States, these drugs were usually given individually or in pairs. By August 1953, none of the 125 patients treated with this drug combination at the hospital had been readmitted for treatment. This contrasted with the previous readmission rate of 17% in the first year post-treatment and 33% following 5 years of treatment.

These antibiotics, usually in combination with other drugs such as Pyrazinamide, Rifapentine, Rifampicin, Moxifloxacin and Ethambutol, are still used in modern day to cure individuals infected with tuberculosis.

== Yakima Valley School (1958–current) ==
Yakima Valley School opened on January 20, 1958, with 220 patients being moved into the facility. A dedication ceremony took place on March 23, 1958. Governor Albert D. Rosellini presided over the ceremony and promised to expand the facility.

In January 2025, a bill named HB 1472 was introduced into the Washington State Legislature to close Yakima Valley School and Rainer School, a similar facility located in Buckley, Washington.
