= Virginia Mason Medical Center =

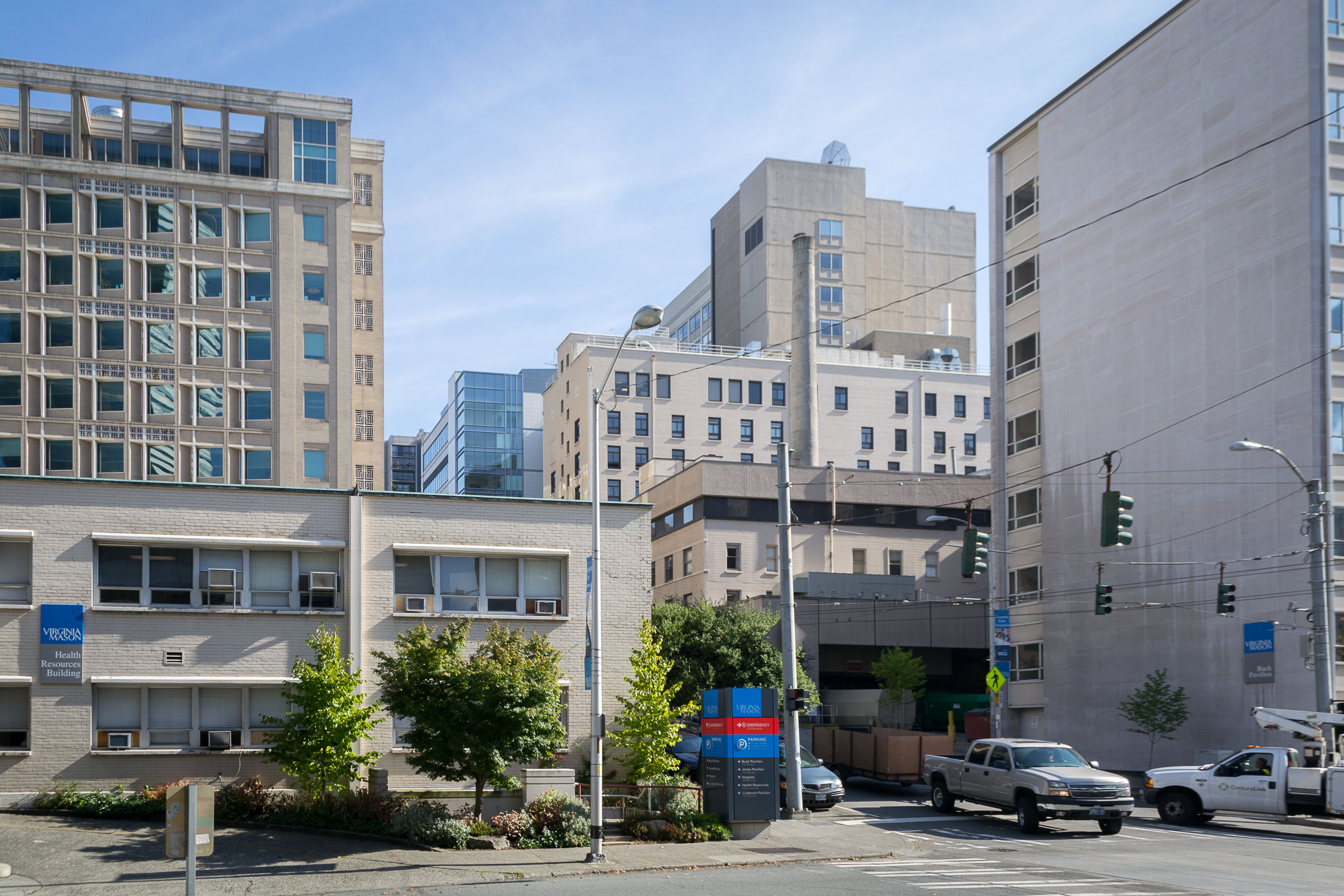
- A view of Virginia Mason Medical Center from 9th Ave. and Seneca St.

Geography
- Location: Seattle, Washington, United States
- Coordinates: 47°36′37″N 122°19′38″W

History
- Founded: 1920

Links
- Website: vmfh.org
- Lists: Hospitals in Washington state

Virginia Mason Medical Center is an integrated hospital, training and research facility located in Seattle, Washington, USA. It was the founding location, in 1920, of the private, non-profit Virginia Mason health organization; in January 2021, the Virginia Mason organization merged with CHI Franciscan to form Virginia Mason Franciscan Health, under the parent company CommonSpirit Health. After the merger, the Virginia Mason Medical Center continues under its original name.

== Organization ==
Virginia Mason Medical Center is organized into a "system of integrated health services:"

- a multi-specialty group practice employing more than 450 primary care and specialized physicians;
- Virginia Mason Hospital, an acute care hospital with 336 beds;
- a network of regional medical centers in Bainbridge Island, Bellevue, Federal Way, Issaquah, Kirkland, Lynnwood, and Seattle;
- Virginia Mason Institute, providing education and training on the Virginia Mason Production System, a process for improving patient care modeled after the Toyota Production System;
- Benaroya Research Institute, where scientists conduct research into autoimmune diseases such as diabetes, rheumatoid arthritis, and AIDS;
- AIDS care, through the Bailey-Boushay House, offering private rooms for 35 patients

Virginia Mason is affiliated with Evergreen Healthcare and St. Francis Hospital. It also engages in philanthropic efforts through its Virginia Mason Foundation, under the guidance of a community board.

== History ==
Virginia Mason Medical Center was founded in 1920 by three physicians: John M. Blackford, James Tate Mason, and Maurice Dwyer; it was named after the daughters of Blackford and Mason. Two years later it created its own school of nursing, which became affiliated with the University of Washington in 1957.

In 1960, Alan E. Nourse, who was an intern at Virginia Mason, wrote The Intern; it was published by Harper & Row in 1965, under the pseudonym "Doctor X".

In 1985, Virginia Mason installed the first lithotripter in the Pacific Northwest.

In 2002, Virginia Mason spearheaded an effort to improve patient safety and quality of care by adopting the Toyota Production System (TPS) to health care. Named the Virginia Mason Production System, Virginia Mason was the first health care institution to implement the TPS philosophy throughout the institution. The two main tenets of this system are to minimize waste through just-in-time production and eliminate defects in the system by empowering staff to "stop the line" whenever they detect a patient safety or quality problem. It was one of the first hospitals in the US to make flu vaccination mandatory for staff. The problem is then analyzed and a solution tested out in a Rapid Process Improvement Workshop. VMPS is reported to have saved the institution $12 to 15 million over the course of six years. Their efforts have resulted in Virginia Mason consistently being named Leapfrog Group's top hospitals, and one of two top hospitals of the decade in 2010.

In 2007, the Seattle Seahawks named their new training facility on Lake Washington the Virginia Mason Athletic Center, as "part of a broad Seattle Seahawks and Virginia Mason partnership to support the health and well-being of our community."

In 2008, Virginia Mason Medical Center established a breast clinic staffed by nurse practitioners to provide comprehensive testing and interpretation services such as breast examinations, mammography, and ultrasound to reduce unnecessary imaging studies and physician visits.

In 2012, Virginia Mason joined Cleveland Clinic, Geisinger Medical Center, Mayo Clinic, Mercy Hospital Springfield in Missouri, and Scott & White Memorial Hospital as a preferred provider in Walmart's "Center of Excellence" employee healthcare program, as a specialist in cardiac procedures, including "coronary artery bypass grafting, heart valve replacement/repair, closures of heart defects, thoracic and aortic aneurysm repair"

In 2014, the medical center announced that it will offer bundled payments and warranties for total hip and total knee replacements for self-insured employers and private insurers.

Jeremy Hunt announced a five-year, £12.5m programme to bring in Virginia Mason to assist five English NHS trusts using clinical engagement and culture tools including the Patient Safety Alert System and electronic dashboard. Hunt said “The achievements at Virginia Mason over the past decade are truly inspirational and I’m delighted they will now help NHS staff to learn the lessons that made their hospital one of the safest in the world – patients will see real benefits as a result.”

In 2016, Virginia Mason Medical Center formally affiliated with Yakima Valley Memorial Hospital.

In August 2020, Virginia Mason opened a birth center, which employed 55 nurses and averaged 50 births a month.

In January 2021, Virginia Mason announced they had merged with CHI Franciscan to form Virginia Mason Franciscan Health, under the parent company CommonSpirit Health.

In October 2024, Virginia Mason closed its birthing center. Patients were transferred to other birthing centers in the Seattle area.

== Notable Staff ==
Vin Gupta serves as a part-time pulmonologist at Virginia Mason Franciscan Health.

== See also ==
- St. Joseph Medical Center
