= Blue Mountain Sanatorium =

Former tuberculosis sanatorium and hospital in Walla Walla, Washington, U.S.

Geography
- Location: Walla Walla, Washington, United States
- Coordinates: 46.0406°N 118.3697°W

Organization
- Type: Sanatorium, County

Services
- Beds: 57

History
- Founded: 1935
- Closed: 1954, 1968

Links
- Lists: Hospitals in Washington state

Blue Mountain Sanatorium was a former tuberculosis sanatorium located in Walla Walla, Washington, United States. The sanatorium operated from 1935 to 1954. The buildings then continued as a hospital (until 1968), then a convalescent center (until 1999), before becoming a private residence.

== Blue Mountain Sanatorium (1935–1954) ==
Construction on the sanatorium began in 1934, with funding and labor being drawn from the Civil Works Administration. The Civil Works Administration was terminated in March 1934, leaving the construction of the hospital incomplete. In May 1934, funding from the Federal Emergency Relief Administration was secured by Washington state congressman Knute Hill to finish the building. Work on the sanatorium resumed in October 1934, with some portions of the building having to be redone due to faulty materials and construction. In April 1935, contracts fo finish the final parts of the sanatorium was awarded by the Walla Walla county commissioners.

The sanatorium was officially opened by June 1935. When opened, patients were transferred from Stone Creek Sanatorium, which was the previous tuberculosis sanatorium for Walla Walla County. On opening, the sanatorium had the capacity to care for up to 24 patients. Dr. R. W. Smith was appointed the chief physician of the institution. Marian S. Gillespie was named as the head nurse of the sanatorium. She had previously worked the Oakhurst Sanatorium in Elma, Washington.

The hospital had occupational therapy programs for patients to aid in their treatment. In 1947, Marjory Abbott was director of the program. Education was also offered to children of high school age who had tuberculosis by visiting teachers. In 1947, the sanatorium had five patients of high school age. In 1949, additional buildings were added to expand the sanatorium. In 1952, a recreation building was added to the sanatorium. In 1953, a two-story occupational therapy building was added. The first floor had a classroom and a hobby room. The second floor had a fire proof projector room to show films to patients.

Blue Mountain Sanatorium officially closed on December 1, 1954. Of the remaining 20 patients, serious cases were sent to the Central Washington Tuberculosis Hospital in Selah, Washington. Other patients were sent to recover at home. In the sanatoriums 19 years of operation, it had admitted over 2,000 patients and successfully treated over 1,800 patients of tuberculosis.

== Blue Mountain Hospital (1954–1968) ==
After the closure of the sanatorium, the facility was reopened as the Blue Mountain Hospital, which functioned as the hospital for Walla Walla county. Patients were moved from the old county hospital on December 28, 1964. The hospital served as the main medical facility for welfare patients from southeastern Washington counties.

In fall of 1958, the hospital faced closure due to a $6,000 budget deficit. Part of this deficit was due to improvements to the facility, which included a new furnace. Proponents of closing the facility argued that it would be cheaper for long term patients at the hospital to be cared for at private nursing homes. Proponents wanted the county to sell the facility or to lease it to a privately run nursing home.

A study conducted by county officials concluded that it would be more expensive to send long term patients to other facilities. It was estimated that patients who were unsuitable to be cared for in private nursing homes would cost $25 a day to care for at local hospitals, such as Walla Walla General Hospital or Saint Mary's Hospital. In comparison, Blue Mountain treated patients for $6.88 per day. On November 17, 1958, Washington governor Albert D. Rosellini sent a letter to the county of Walla Walla stating that the hospital would not be closed.

In 1966, the hospital again faced closure. Issues included overcrowding, with the facility consistently having its 57 beds full at all times. Other issues included bringing the hospital up to modern state and federal safety and medical standards. Financially, the hospital faced a $4,000 deficit by October of the same year. Much of this deficit was due to the hospital caring for mainly welfare and public assistance patients. Of the 57 beds the hospital had, 46 were dedicated to public care, while 8 were set aside for private use for the hospital to gain income.

The hospital closed in 1968 under the direction of governor Daniel J. Evans. On closure, the hospital was one of the final county run hospitals left in Washington, with the other two being in King and Whatcom County.

== Post-closure ==
The building became a nursing home named Blue Mountain Convalescent Center, which closed in 1999. The building is now a private residence.
