= MultiCare Health System =

Geography
- Location: Washington, United States

Organization
- Type: Health system

Links
- Website: www.multicare.org
- Lists: Hospitals in Washington state

MultiCare Health System is a not-for-profit American health care organization based in Tacoma, Washington. Founded in 1882, MultiCare provides health care services at dozens of locations, including eight hospitals, across Washington state.

The system also operates Indigo Urgent Care, a chain of urgent care centers in Washington that debuted in 2016. In 2022, Indigo Urgent Care expanded its brand to include primary care, under the new name, Indigo Health.

In 2023, MultiCare acquired Yakima Memorial Hospital.

In 2024, MultiCare merged with Overlake Medical Center in Bellevue.

In 2025, MultiCare announced its intention to acquire Oregon-based hospital chain Samaritan Health Services.

In February 2026, MultiCare agreed to pay a $3.7 million settlement over allegations that it "knowingly permitted and billed procedures conducted by a neurosurgeon under investigation for fraudulent, medically unnecessary care."

== MultiCare Indigo Health ==
MultiCare Indigo Health is a chain of urgent care centers and telehealth services provided by MultiCare in the Seattle metropolitan area and Spokane metropolitan area (including Coeur d'Alene, Idaho). It includes 44 clinics and debuted in 2016.

== Hospitals ==
- Mary Bridge Children's Hospital and Health Center
- MultiCare Allenmore Hospital
- MultiCare Auburn Medical
- MultiCare Capital Medical Center
- MultiCare Covington Medical Center
- MultiCare Deaconess Hospital
- MultiCare Good Samaritan Hospital
- * Overlake Hospital Medical Center (Bellevue)
- MultiCare Tacoma General Hospital
- Multicare Valley Hospital
- MultiCare Yakima Memorial Hospital
- Wellfound Behavioral Health Hospital
