= ZoomCare =

Chain of health care clinics based in Portland, Oregon, U.S.

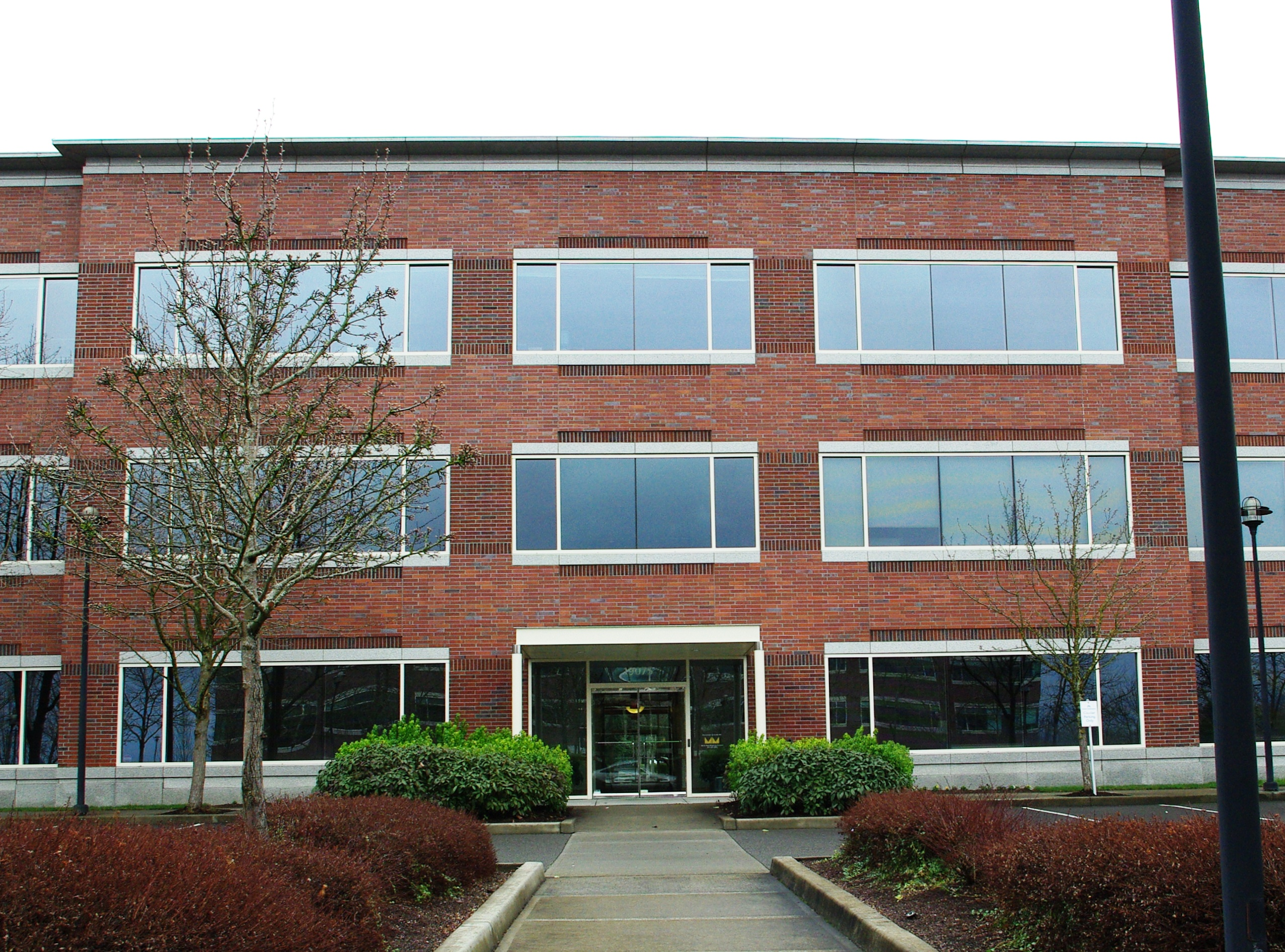
- Office building in Hillsboro, Oregon with ZoomCare's corporate offices, 2010
- Founded: 2006; 20 years ago
- Founders: Dave Sanders; Albert DiPiero
- Headquarters: Tigard, Oregon, United States
- Number of locations: 47 (2020)
- Key people: Jeff Fee (CEO)
- Website: www.zoomcare.com

ZoomCare is a Portland, Oregon-based chain of health care clinics. The company has 47 clinics in the U.S. states of Oregon and Washington, as of February 2025.

Zoom was co-founded by Dave Sanders and Albert DiPiero in 2006. Bill Frerichs began as chief executive officer in December 2018. In May 2019, Torben Nielsen was named CEO, replacing interim CEO Frerichs. PeaceHealth acquired Zoom in 2019 and appointed Torben Nielsen as CEO. In July 2021 Jeff Fee was appointed CEO, replacing Nielsen.

== History ==
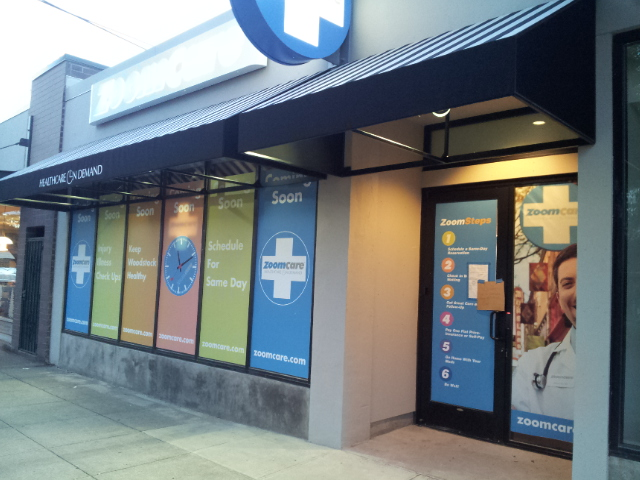
Clinic in Portland, Oregon's Woodstock neighborhood, 2013

ZoomCare's first clinic was opened in Tigard, Oregon, in 2006. The company opened its eighth clinic in 2011. In 2012, ZoomCare began offering medical care at no cost at one location for one evening each month.

The company made a minority equity deal with Endeavour Capital in mid 2014. ZoomCare operated 23 clinics in Oregon, Washington, and Idaho at the time. The company also started offering insurance in 2014, but left the market by December 31, 2017. Zoom Health had approximately 2,700 customers.

In March 2015, ZoomCare announced a nine-location expansion. The company announced a name change as well as business model changes in May, becoming known as Zoom+ Performance Health Insurance. By mid 2015, there were 21 clinics in the Portland metropolitan area and Salem, plus six in Seattle.

As of December 1, 2024, ZoomCare began accepting Medicare and Medicare Advantage insurance. However, the company does not accept Medicaid or Oregon Health Plan insurance. In July 2016, ZoomCare settled a trademark infringement lawsuit brought by Blue Cross and Blue Shield in 2015.

ZoomCare was subpoenaed for medical records by the Federal Bureau of Investigation in mid 2017. The company also settled with Oregon insurance officials over a financial statement discrepancy in 2017. In October, Endeavour decided to invest $24 million in ZoomCare, after settling a dispute out of court. ZoomCare was profitable in 2017. The company and Aetna partnered on Aetna Whole Health in 2018.

PeaceHealth, based in Vancouver, Washington, acquired ZoomCare in December 2018.

== Recognition ==
ZoomCare won in the "Best Primary Doctor" category in Willamette Week's 2017 readers' poll.

== See also ==
- List of companies based in Oregon
