= PeaceHealth St. Joseph Medical Center =

Hospital in Bellingham, Washington

- PeaceHealth

Geography
- Location: 2901 Squalicum Parkway, Bellingham, Washington, Washington, United States
- Coordinates: 48.7734°N 122.4739°W

Services
- Emergency department: Level II trauma center
- Beds: 251

Helipads
- Helipad: FAA LID: WN73

History
- Former name: St. Joseph Hospital
- Opened: January 1891

Links
- Website: PeaceHealth St. Joseph Medical Center
- Lists: Hospitals in Washington state

PeaceHealth St. Joseph Medical Center (commonly shortened to St. Joe's) is a hospital operated by PeaceHealth in Bellingham, Washington. Its trauma center is the Haggen Family Emergency and Trauma Center, a level II trauma center.

The hospital provides general medical care, as well as specialized treatment for heart and joint conditions and cancer. It is the only hospital in Whatcom County. They have 251 licensed beds.

== History ==
St. Joseph Hospital was opened in January 1891, established by nuns of the Sisters of St. Joseph of Peace; it was the first hospital established by what is now PeaceHealth. St. Joseph was originally located in a two-story home in Fairhaven with 30 beds. The hospital moved to their first permanent home—on Forest Street—in 1901. It moved to a suburban campus in 1966 centered around an 81-bed building. St. Joseph acquired the crosstown St. Luke's Hospital in 1989 after the two hospitals agreed to end their long rivalry.

During the COVID-19 pandemic, the hospital changed its visitation policies multiple times, but opened patients to one visitor at a time starting in September 2022 and two visitors starting in October of that year.

== Helipad ==
The hospital's helipad (Note: Officially registered with the Federal Aviation Administration as "ST JOSEPH HOSPITAL MAIN CAMPUS HELIPORT") is often used to airlift patients to Harborview Medical Center, the only level I trauma center in the state. Medical airlift services at St. Joseph are operated by AirLift Northwest and Life Flight Network.

Video of airlift helicopter at St. Joseph Medical Center
- Airlift 6 Touching Down via Facebook

== Rankings ==
The hospital was ranked number 9 in the state of Washington by U.S. News & World Report Best Hospitals Rankings.
