= MultiCare Tacoma General Hospital =

Coordinates: 47.2593°N 122.4532°W

Tacoma General Hospital
- MultiCare Health System

Geography
- Location: 315 Martin Luther King Junior Way, Tacoma, Washington, United States

Services
- Emergency department: Level II trauma center
- Beds: 437

Helipads
- Helipad: Yes

History
- Founded: 1882

Links
- Website: www.multicare.org/find-a-location/tacoma-general-hospital/about/
- Lists: Hospitals in Washington state

MultiCare Health System's Tacoma General Hospital is the largest hospital in Tacoma, Washington. It is a level II trauma center with 437 beds and the second-largest obstetrical care center in the state of Washington. Tacoma General began serving patients in 1882. The hospital is owned and operated by MultiCare Health System, a Tacoma-based not-for-profit integrated health organization.

== History ==
Tacoma General's beginnings trace back to the earliest days of the city of Tacoma. Founded in 1882, seven years before Washington achieved statehood, the Fannie C. Paddock Memorial Hospital opened its doors in a former dance hall at 2511 North Starr Street in what is now Old Town Tacoma. Frances (Fannie) Chester Fanning Paddock was the wife of John A Paddock, who was the first Episcopal bishop of Washington Territory. As Fannie Paddock prepared to move West to join her husband, she asked him what was the greatest need in Tacoma. He responded that they needed a hospital. She began raising money by asking her friends to support this cause and had collected $500 before she started her journey to Tacoma. Mrs. Paddock fell ill during her trip west and died shortly after arriving in Portland. The hospital was named in her honor by her husband Bishop Paddock exactly one year after Fannie died. Today, what was once the Fannie C. Paddock Memorial Hospital is now MultiCare Tacoma General Hospital, and the healthcare mission begun in that converted dance hall has evolved over the last 130 years into MultiCare Health System — the largest healthcare system in the South Puget Sound region. The name of the hospital was changed in 1912.

== Facilities ==
Tacoma General has 437 licensed beds. It is a level II adult trauma center and contains 16 operating rooms, 4 cardiac catheterization labs, a 27-bed medical-surgical intensive care unit, a 25-bed cardiac care unit, and a level IV neonatal intensive care unit. Tacoma General is physically attached to Mary Bridge Children's Hospital, which is also run by MultiCare. Mary Bridge has 82 licensed beds and is a level II pediatric trauma center.

== Volume ==
In 2007 Tacoma General had 14,185 inpatient admissions (14,723 with Neonates), delivered 3,149 babies, performed 6,818 surgeries, conducted 32,121 home health visits, received 40,724 emergency room visits, and 64,904 outpatient visits (excluding ER). In 2007, Mary Bridge Children's Hospital had 3,990 medical and surgical inpatient admissions, 359 pediatric intensive care unit admissions, performed 5,392 surgeries, received 30,147 emergency department visits, and 41,055 outpatient clinic visits.

== Snakes! ==
In 2016, a live python was found in the hospital when it fell from the ceiling. Months prior to its discovery a visitor to the hospital smuggled in the snake in a pet carrier. It wasn't until after the visitor left that they realized the snake had gone missing. After an initial search did not reveal the location of the snake, it was assumed the snake was not in the hospital. However, after a few months the snake revealed itself by crawling out of the ventilation and dropped to the floor.
