= PeaceHealth =

American healthcare network

- Type: Private
- Industry: Health care
- Founded: 1976; 50 years ago
- Founder: Sisters of St. Joseph of Peace
- Headquarters: Vancouver, Washington, U.S.
- Area served: Alaska; Oregon; Washington
- Key people: Sarah Ness (president and CEO); Richard DeCarlo (EVP and COO)
- Services: Health care
- Revenue: 1,637,731,131 United States dollar (2011)
- Total assets: 2,591,551,712 United States dollar (2011)
- Number of employees: 16,000 (2019)
- Subsidiaries: ZoomCare
- Website: peacehealth.org

PeaceHealth is an American not-for-profit health care system that owns and operates ten hospitals and numerous clinics in the U.S. states of Alaska, Oregon, and Washington. The organization is headquartered in Vancouver, Washington, and was founded by the Catholic Sisters of St. Joseph of Peace in 1976.

== History ==
In August 1890, nuns of the Sisters of St. Joseph of Peace moved to Fairhaven, Washington, from the convent in Newark, New Jersey, to establish a hospital for loggers; St. Joseph Hospital opened in January 1891. After continued growth, the Sisters consolidated their healthcare ministries in the west and formed a not-for-profit health care system in 1976, and in 1994 the name was changed to PeaceHealth. In 1997, PeaceHealth merged its SelectCare health insurance plan with a service from Providence Health & Services. Their partnership has continued until at least 2015, when in October of 2015, they jointly signed a letter of intent to collaborate on a health center in Vancouver, Washington. In 2016, both parties denied that they were eyeing merging.

PeaceHealth merged with Southwest Washington Health System in December 2010, and moved its headquarters from Bellevue to Vancouver, Washington. At the time, PeaceHealth had annual revenues of approximately $1.3 billion and operated seven hospitals. The organization announced an alliance with University of Washington Medical Center in May 2013, which the American Civil Liberties Union criticized due to PeaceHealth following Catholic medical care directives.

PeaceHealth acquired ZoomCare in 2019.

PeaceHealth changed their logo in spring of 2023, to better reflect their focus on "whole person wellness".

In November 2023, the Sacred Heart Medical Center University District was closed and replaced fully by the Sacred Heart Medical Center RiverBend.

On May 22, 2025, PeaceHealth reduced its workforce by 1% and implemented a hiring freeze through the end of 2025. All PeaceHealth employees received an email from Richard DeCarlo, executive vice president and COO, and Sarah Ness, executive vice president and chief administration officer that said certain programs and workforce across Springfield, Ore.-based PeaceHealth, Sacred Heart at RiverBend Medical Centers, and Vancouver-based PeaceHealth SouthWest Medical Center would be affected by the reductions.

== PeaceHealth Medical Group ==
PeaceHealth operates nine hospitals in three states:

- Alaska
  - PeaceHealth Ketchikan Medical Center (Ketchikan)
- Oregon
  - PeaceHealth Cottage Grove Community Medical Center (Cottage Grove)
  - PeaceHealth Peace Harbor Medical Center (Florence)
  - PeaceHealth Sacred Heart Medical Center RiverBend (Springfield)
- Washington (state)
  - PeaceHealth St. Joseph Medical Center (Bellingham)
  - PeaceHealth Peace Island Medical Center (Friday Harbor)
  - PeaceHealth St. John Medical Center (Longview)
  - PeaceHealth United General Medical Center (Sedro-Woolley)
  - PeaceHealth Southwest Medical Center (Vancouver)

The hospitals, as well as the 139 clinics operated by PeaceHealth, constitute the PeaceHealth Medical Group.

=== Networks ===
PeaceHealth operates three networks: Northwest (containing their locations in Bellingham, Friday Harbor, and Sedro-Woolley, as well as Alaska), Columbia (containing their locations in Longview and Vancouver), and Oregon.

== PeaceHealth Laboratories ==
PeaceHealth Laboratories is the laboratory branch of PeaceHealth. Its CEO is Ran Whitehead.
