= Bailey-Boushay House =

HIV care facility in Seattle, Washington, US

Bailey-Boushay House, founded June 24, 1992, is an inpatient long-term care facility and outpatient day health program for people with HIV/AIDS in Seattle, Washington, US. It is an affiliate of Virginia Mason Medical Center.

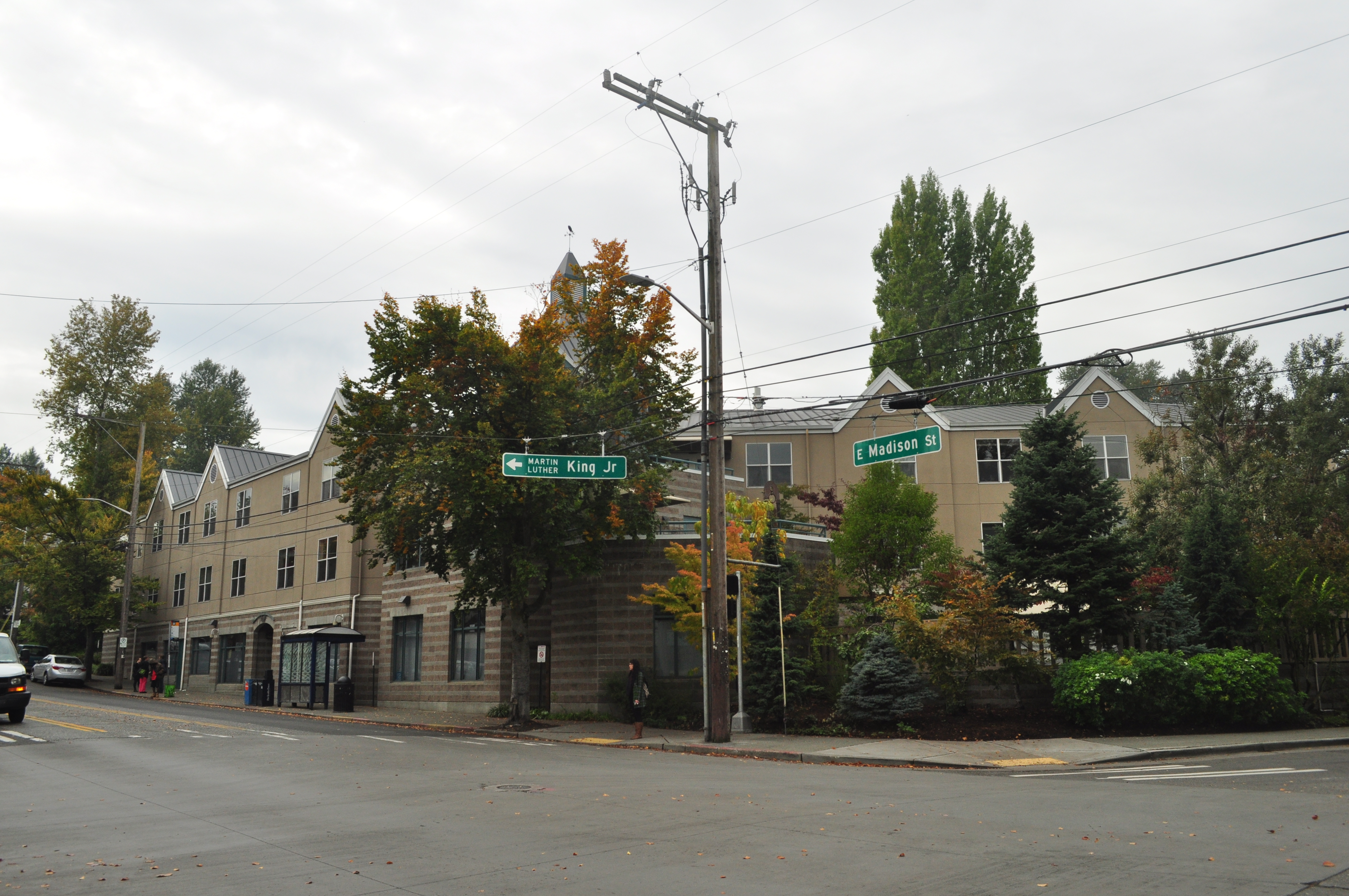

== History ==
Bailey-Boushay House was the first inpatient hospice facility for AIDS patients in the United States. It was founded by Betsy Lieberman and Christine Hurley of AIDS Housing of Washington with support from sources including Virginia Mason Medical Center, Boeing, Nordstrom, Weyerhaeuser, the Northwest AIDS Foundation, and an anonymous donation of $100,000 via the Archdiocese of Seattle. The facility was created as a response to the lack of skilled nursing facilities available for AIDS patients.

The choice of location for Bailey-Boushay House in Seattle's Madison Valley neighborhood faced opposition from some community members, including a member of the board of the Seattle Art Museum, who expressed concerns about the presence of people with AIDS. (Note: The neighbors' concerns centered around AIDS (which, at the time, little was known about and was almost always fatal) and the presence of openly gay people, given that, at the time, AID was considered a "gay" disease. (Specific mentions are in video reference starting at 7:20 and 7:50.)) In response to this opposition, the Seattle chapter of ACT UP organized protests, including planning to shut down the art museum's construction site to highlight the need for a facility for local AIDS patients. However, two days before the planned protest, the opposition withdrew.

The facility was named after Seattle publisher Thatcher Bailey, a founding donor, and his partner Frank Boushay, who died of AIDS in 1989. Bailey-Boushay House was dedicated on January 12, 1992. By 1992, over 2,000 cases of AIDS had been diagnosed in King County, with 90% of the cases present in men who have sex with men. In the first years at Bailey-Boushay, patients would often arrive from hospitals only a few days before their death from AIDS-related complications.

In the early 1990s, the photographers Saul Bromberger and Sandra Hoover documented the daily life of Bailey-Boushay patients, and their work was published in Mother Jones magazine on World AIDS Day in 2014.

Every year on Valentine's Day, Bailey-Boushay House used to place hundreds of red balloons on the outside of their facility to officially thank the community for their support.

== Current work ==
As of 2017, due to the significant decrease in death rates from HIV/AIDS due to antiretroviral therapy, the 35-bed inpatient program at Bailey-Boushay House serves patients with a variety of life-threatening diagnoses, such as amyotrophic lateral sclerosis and Huntington's disease, providing long-term, respite, and end-of-life care. The outpatient day health program serves patients with HIV who are homeless, and/or capable of living independently in the community but require medication management and social support. Bailey-Boushay House plans to open a 50-bed overnight shelter to promote housing stability for its outpatient clients, with a projected opening date of November 1, 2018.
