= Olympic Medical Center =

Coordinates: 48°06′56″N 123°24′54″W

Olympic Memorial Hospital
- Olympic Medical Center
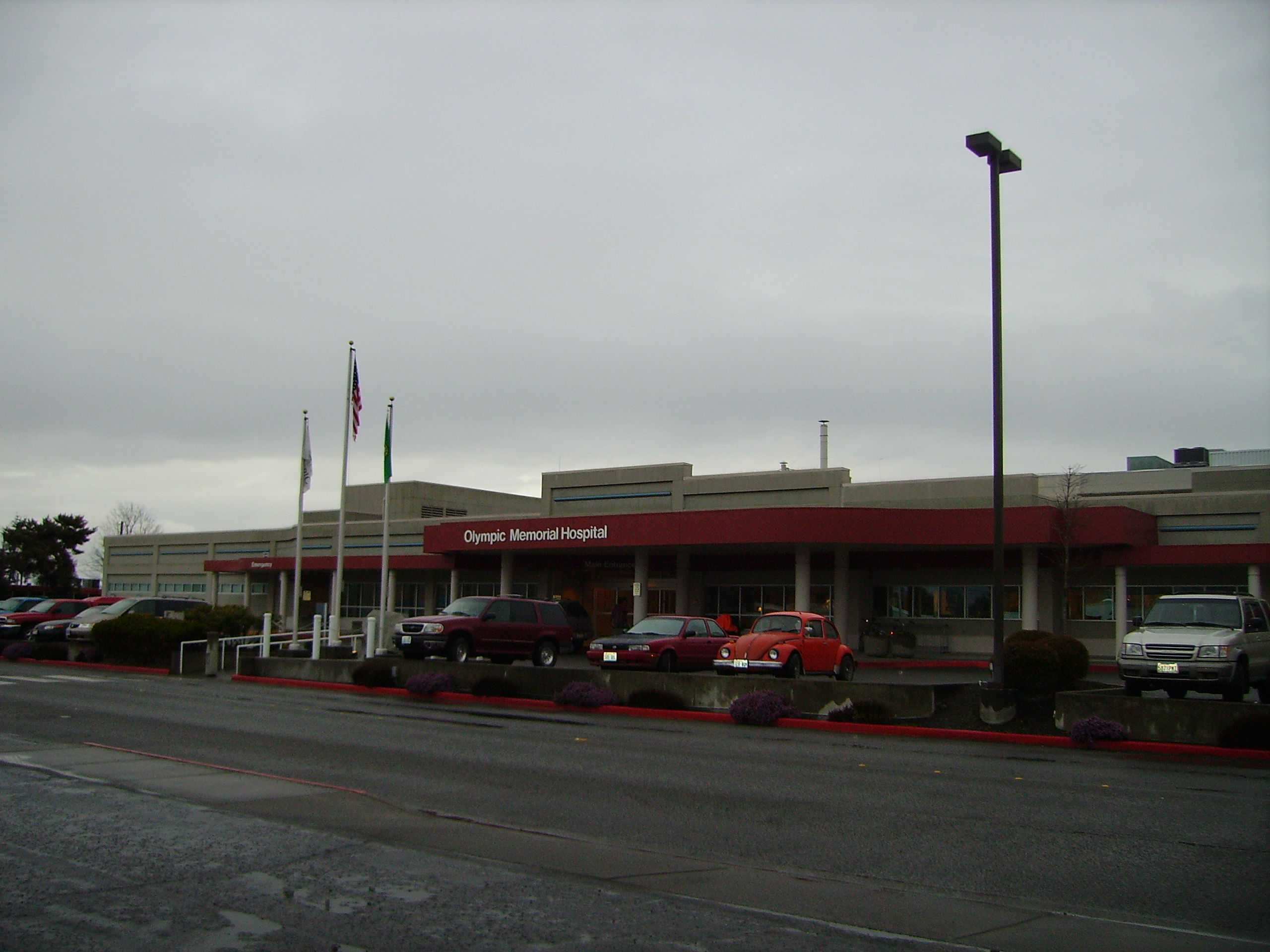

Geography
- Location: 939 Caroline Street, Port Angeles, Washington, United States

Organization
- Type: Community

Services
- Emergency department: Level III trauma center
- Beds: 126

History
- Founded: 1951

Links
- Website: www.olympicmedical.org
- Lists: Hospitals in Washington state

Olympic Medical Center is a medical organization located in Port Angeles and Sequim, Washington which provides services to patients in Clallam and Jefferson counties. The principal operating location is Olympic Memorial Hospital in Port Angeles. This location consists of 126 in-patient hospital beds and many other hospital services and has one of two Level III trauma centers in the state.

Olympic Medical Center was established on November 1, 1951, with the founding of the hospital. The organization has grown into the largest employer on the Olympic Peninsula with over 1500 employees.

== See also ==
- List of hospitals in Washington (state)
