= PeaceHealth Southwest Medical Center =

Coordinates: 45.623°N 122.580°W

- PeaceHealth System

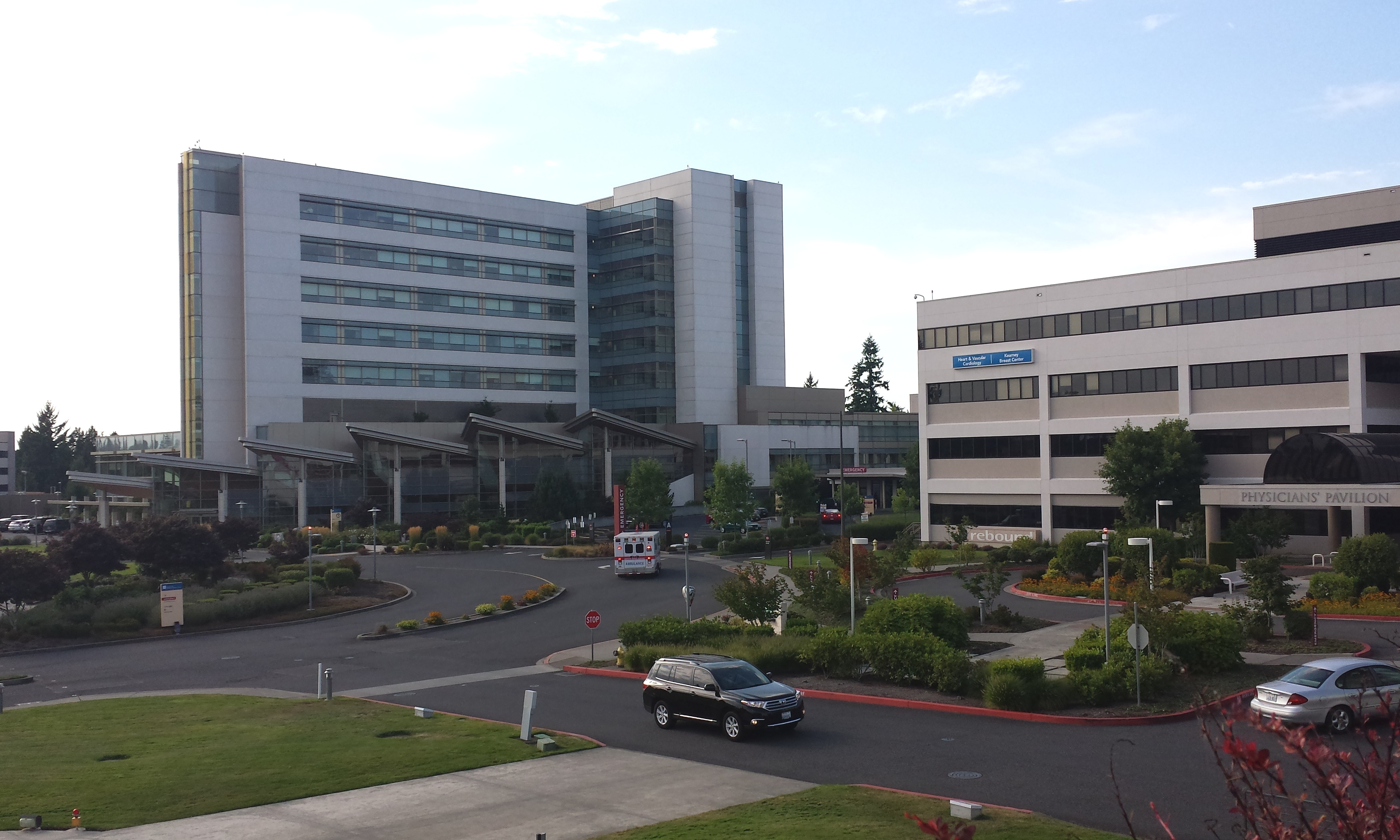
- PeaceHealth Southwest Medical Center in July, 2013.

Geography
- Location: 400 Northeast Mother Joseph Place, Vancouver, Washington, United States

Organization
- Type: Community
- Network: PeaceHealth

Services
- Emergency department: Level II trauma center
- Beds: 450

Helipads
- Helipad: Yes

History
- Former names: St. Joseph Community Hospital; Southwest Washington Medical Center
- Founded: 1858

Links
- Website: www.peacehealth.org/southwest-medical-center/
- Lists: Hospitals in Washington state

PeaceHealth Southwest Medical Center is a 450-bed community hospital located in Vancouver, Washington. The hospital was founded in 1858.

In 2010, the hospital had about 114,000 emergency department (ED) visits, 27,000 in-patient visits, and 3,000 child births. The ED is the busiest ER north of San Francisco on the west coast, and the birth center is the second busiest obstetrics unit in the Portland metropolitan area. The sleep center is accredited by the American Academy of Sleep Medicine. The hospital is accredited by the joint commission, and the Commission on Accreditation of Rehabilitation Facilities (CARF). The cardiovascular rehabilitation program is certified by the American Association of Cardiovascular and Pulmonary Rehabilitation. PeaceHealth Southwest Medical Center is a certified stroke center.

== History ==
PeaceHealth Southwest Medical Center was founded in 1858 by Mother Joseph Pariseau. It is the oldest hospital in the Pacific Northwest region of the United States. Originally named St. Joseph Community Hospital and then Southwest Washington Medical Center, the hospital opened at its present location in 1972 and merged with PeaceHealth in 2010 and was renamed PeaceHealth Southwest Medical Center. The entire PeaceHealth system has 15,000 employees and about $2 billion in revenue. In August 2012, PeaceHealth announced plans to merge with Catholic Health Initiative. If the merger became official, the newly formed organization would have a total of 26,000 employees, 16 hospitals, and nearly $4 billion in revenue. This building is located at 400 NE Mother Joseph Place in Vancouver, WA 98664.

In 2010, the hospital began a bloodless surgery program for community members, such as Jehovah's Witnesses, that refuse blood products. In 2011, the hospital received $1.2 million in grants for the cardiology department, the neuroscience institute, and the behavioral health program.

== Graduate Medical Education ==
The hospital operates a family medicine residency that is affiliated with the University of Washington. The program started in 1995, and has trained 89 family physicians.

== HealthGrades Ratings ==
The HealthGrades website contains much rating data for this hospital. Twelve patient safety indicators are listed. Two of the indicators in the latest rating were worse than average, five were average and five were better than average. Much data was collected from patient experience surveys. One question asked how high the patient would rate the hospital. 75% of PeaceHealth patients gave the hospital a nine or ten versus 69% of all patients from all other hospitals in the United States. Another group of data provided in-hospital outcomes for a number of procedures from the last data collection period. One outcome was worse than expected for one type of procedure, the hospital received as expected outcomes for thirty procedure types and it received better than expected outcomes for five procedure types.

== Sustainability ==
PeaceHealth Southwest Medical Center established its environmental sustainability program in October 2020 by initially joining Practice Greenhealth, a nonprofit membership organization founded on the principles of positive environmental stewardship and best practices by organizations in the healthcare community and then establishing its first full-time role solely focused on the establishment and management of a sustainability program.

Environmental Program Awards:

2021 - Practice Greenhealth Environmental Excellence

2022 - Clark County Green Business of the Year

2022 & 2023 - Practice Greenhealth Partner for Change

2022 & 2023 - Practice Greenhealth Greening the OR

2023 - WA State Recycling Association Non-Profit Recycler of the Year
