= Yakima Valley Memorial Hospital =

MultiCare Yakima Valley Memorial Hospital
- MultiCare Health System

Geography
- Location: Yakima, Washington, United States
- Coordinates: 46°35′37″N 120°32′53″W

Organization
- Care system: Non-Profit

Services
- Emergency department: Level III trauma center
- Beds: 238

Helipads
- Helipad: Yes

History
- Former names: Yakima Valley Memorial Hospital, Virginia Mason Memorial Hospital
- Founded: 1950 76 years ago

Links
- Website: www.multicare.org/location/yakima-memorial-hospital/
- Lists: Hospitals in Washington state

MultiCare Yakima Memorial Hospital, formerly, Yakima Valley Memorial Hospital, Virginia Mason Memorial Hospital is a general hospital in Yakima, Washington with 238 licensed beds. It is a level III adult and pediatric trauma center, with a 34-bed emergency department and a 27-bed critical care unit.

The hospital provides birthing services, a neonatal intensive care unit, a pediatrics unit, and cancer services.

The hospital was founded in 1950 and is governed by the private not-for-profit Yakima Valley Memorial Hospital Association. It is Yakima's third largest employer, with around 2,500 workers.

In 2016, following affiliation with Virginia Mason Medical Center in Seattle, Yakima Valley Memorial Hospital became Virginia Mason Memorial Hospital.

In 2020, Yakima Valley Memorial Hospital reverted to its previous name after board members decided to unwind from the Virginia Mason Health System.

In May 2022, Yakima Valley Memorial Hospital signed a letter of intent to explore merging with MultiCare Health Systems. In 2023, the merger was completed.

== Therac-25 Incidents ==
Yakima Valley Memorial Hospital was the site of two clinical radiotherapy incidents, wherein hospital staff used a Therac-25 machine to treat cancer patients. Due to a coding error in the machine, the two patients involved received significant overdoses of radiation.
