= East Adams Rural Hospital =

Coordinates: 47°07′16″N 118°22′19″W

East Adams Rural Healthcare
- Adams County Public Hospital District #2

Geography
- Location: Ritzville, Adams County, Washington, United States

Organization
- Care system: Public hospital district
- Type: Critical access hospital

Services
- Emergency department: Level V
- Beds: 20

Links
- Lists: Hospitals in Washington state

East Adams Rural Healthcare is a twenty-bed Critical Access Hospital located in Ritzville, Washington, at the junction of Interstate 90 and US Route 395. Adams County Public Hospital District #2 operates the hospital in Ritzville, as well as medical clinics in Ritzville and Washtucna, and is associated with the Ritzville, Lind, and Washtucna Volunteer Ambulance Associations. Together, these organizations serve a 1,500 square miles (3,900 km^{2}) area of eastern Adams County, Washington, and a district population of about 3,900. The hospital emergency department is a Level V Trauma Care Center, a Level II Cardiac Center, and a Level III Stroke Center; it serves its community, as well as accident victims from the adjacent major highways.

The umbrella district was long known as "East Adams Rural Hospital", but on August 28, 2014, the Board of Commissioners voted to change the district's DBA to "East Adams Rural Healthcare" to better reflect the scope of its operations, in that the district was then acquiring, by gift, the skilled-nursing facility known as "Life Care Center of Ritzville", then an operation of Life Care Centers of America. In early 2017, however, the district elected to close the Care Center, owing to the great drain it was creating on District finances.

The district is thus now operating the hospital in Ritzville, the medical clinic in Ritzville, and a satellite medical clinic in nearby Washtucna.

The District is active in a number of regional associations and partnerships. It is one of thirteen rural hospital districts in Washington State that compose the Washington Rural Hospital Access Preservation group, which the state legislature has funded for a three-year program to facilitate transition to value-based alternative payment methods aimed at helping small rural health-care facilities remain financially viable. The District is also a founding member of the five-district inter-local Grand Columbia Health Alliance, comprising five rural health-care public hospital districts in central-eastern Washington, a cooperative effort aimed at securing the advantages of size while allowing each member district to retain its independent identity.

== See also ==
- List of hospitals in Washington (state)
