= Mary Bridge Children's Hospital =

- MultiCare Health System

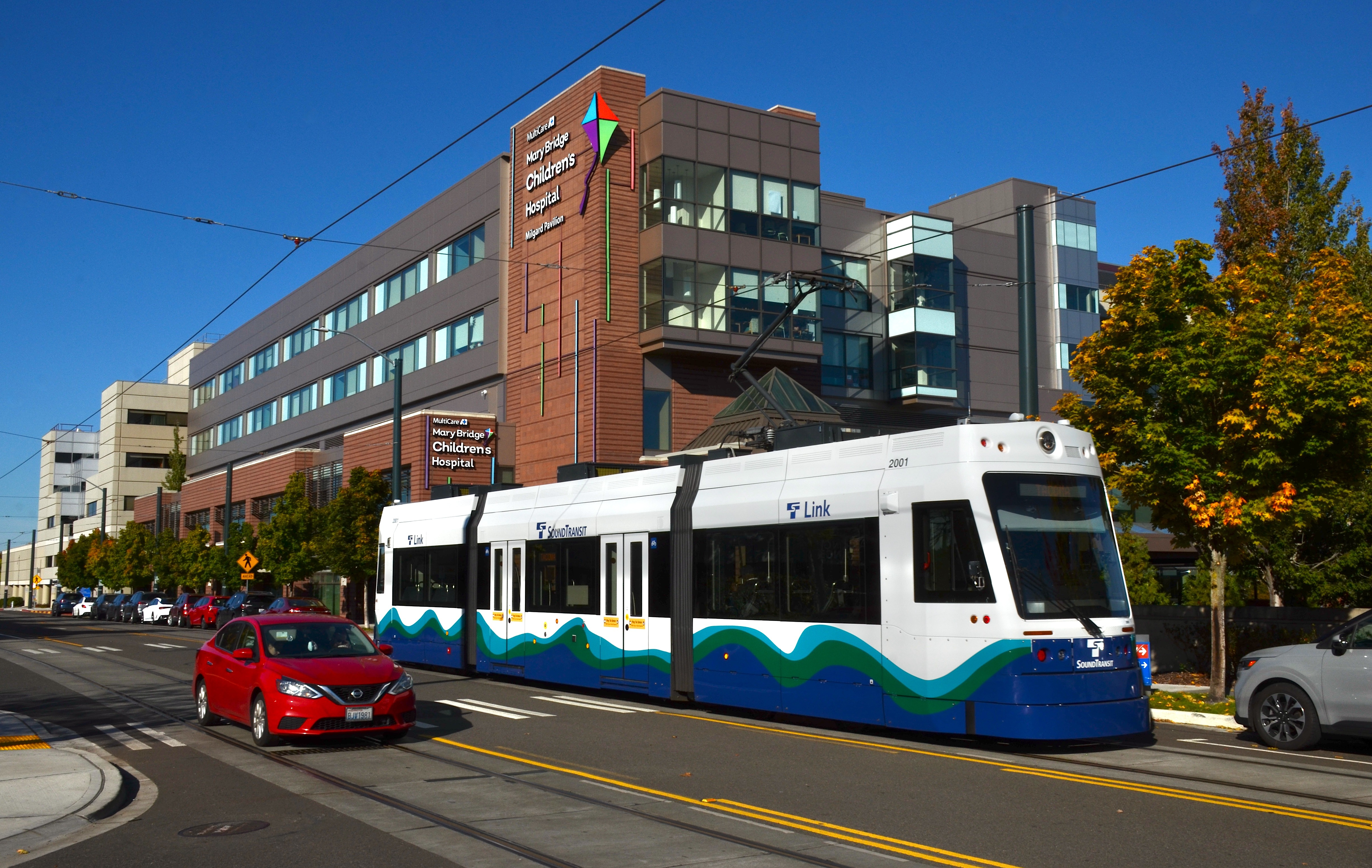
- The building being passed by a T Line streetcar

Geography
- Location: 305 South L Street, Tacoma, Washington, United States
- Coordinates: 47°15′33″N 122°27′09″W

Organization
- Type: Specialist

Services
- Emergency department: Level II trauma center
- Beds: 82
- Speciality: Children's hospital

Helipads
- Helipad: Yes

History
- Founded: 1955

Links
- Website: www.marybridge.org
- Lists: Hospitals in Washington state

Mary Bridge Children's Hospital is a pediatric hospital located in Tacoma, Washington. It is an 82-bed facility and a state-designated level II pediatric trauma center. Mary Bridge was established in 1955 by members of Tacoma Orthopedic Association, a women's volunteer group established in 1921. Members of the Tacoma Orthopedic Association saw a need for a specialized pediatric health care center in Tacoma. Key funding came from the estate of Dr. Albert W. Bridge, a physician who practiced in Eatonville, Washington and later also opened a clinic in Tacoma. The hospital was named for his mother, Mary.

Mary Bridge is physically connected with Tacoma General Hospital and both hospitals are owned and operated by MultiCare Health System, a Tacoma-based not-for-profit integrated health organization. Consequently, Mary Bridge and Tacoma General cooperate extensively and share resources with each other. Mary Bridge is affiliated with the University of Washington and is an active teaching site for medical students. It also has a joint pediatric heart surgery program with Seattle Children's hospital.

== Facilities ==
Mary Bridge has 82 licensed beds. It has a 13-bed pediatric intensive care unit (PICU). In 2004, a $67 million surgery center was added to the Mary Bridge campus. In 2005, the outpatient center moved into a new facility. In May 2026, the hospital moved into a new standalone facility.

== Volume of health care services ==
In 2007, Mary Bridge Children's Hospital had 3,990 medical and surgical inpatient admissions, 359 pediatric intensive care unit admissions, performed 5,392 surgeries, received 30,147 emergency department visits, and 41,055 outpatient clinic visits.
