= Virginia Mason Hospital =

Coordinates: 47°36′37″N 122°19′38″W

- Virginia Mason Medical Center
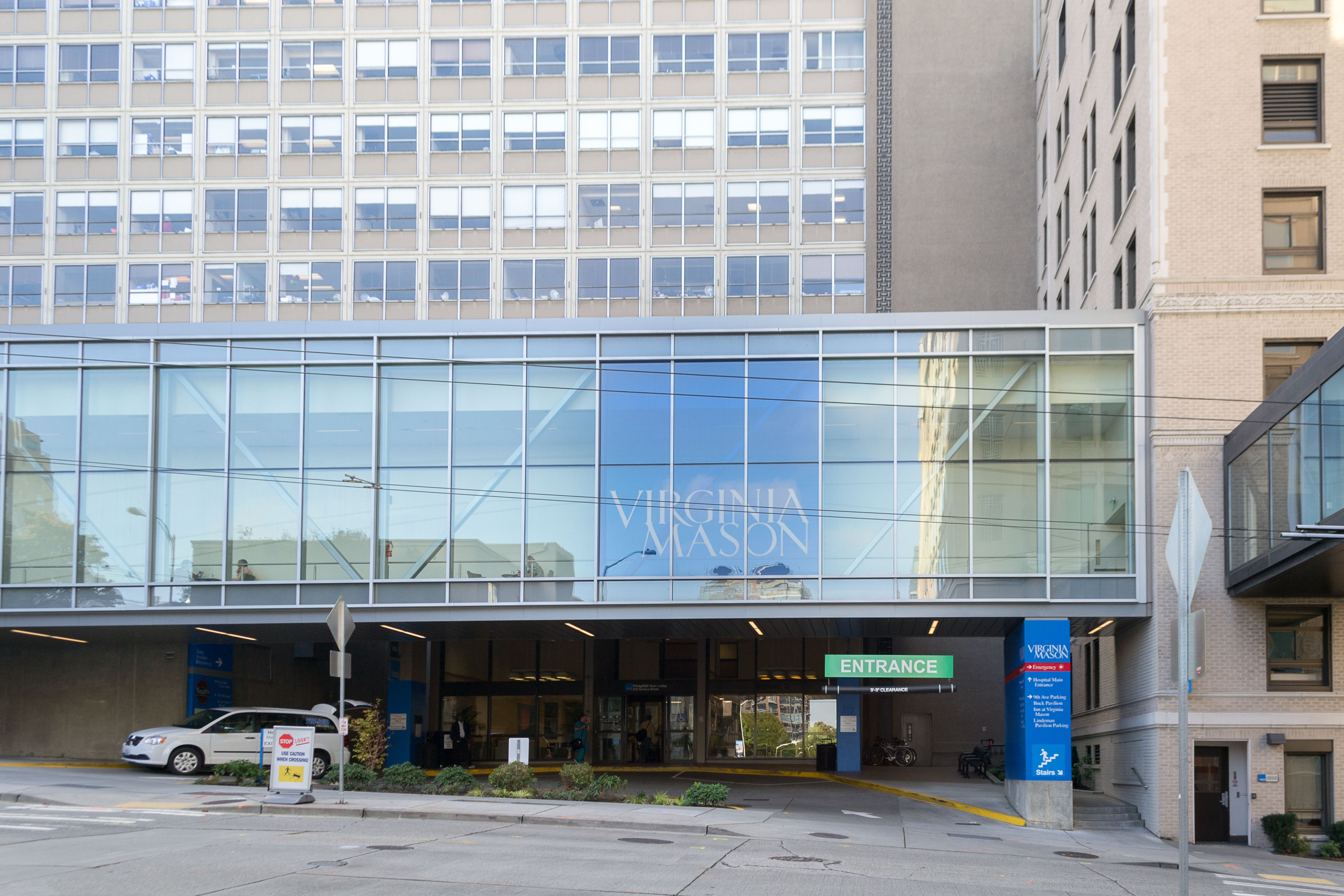
- Main entrance at Seneca St. and Terry Ave.

Geography
- Location: Seattle, Washington, United States

Organization
- Care system: Private

Services
- Emergency department: Yes
- Beds: 336

History
- Founded: 1920

Links
- Website: virginiamason.org/dept
- Lists: Hospitals in Washington state

Virginia Mason Hospital is a 336-bed teaching hospital in Seattle, Washington, part of the Virginia Mason Medical Center. The hospital is accredited by the Joint Commission and the Commission on Accreditation of Rehabilitation Facilities (CARF). Founded in 1920, the hospital operates several accredited residency programs that train newly graduated physicians.

== History ==
Virginia Mason Hospital was established in 1920 as an 80-bed hospital with offices for six physicians. In 2011, the hospital opened a 250,000 square-foot, 7-story building named the Floyd & Delores Jones Pavilion. It houses a new Emergency Department on the 7th floor, Intensive Care Unit, and procedure and operating rooms. Also added is the ability to isolate floors to contain any outbreaks of infectious diseases. The expansion was pursued, as some of the hospital's older buildings were susceptible to damage from earthquakes and were affected by the 2001 Nisqually earthquake.

In 2000, the hospital began applying the Toyota Production system, also known as the lean system, in an effort to improve patient care. In 2002, hospital leadership visited Toyota's factories in Japan to study methods of improving efficiency. In the last year with data available, Virginia Mason Hospital had 22,722 emergency room visits, 15,543 admissions, performed 7,267 inpatient surgeries and 9,973 outpatient surgeries.

Staff at the hospital have been among the first to introduce a number of new treatments and innovations, including:

- The first use of deep therapy X-ray in 1937
- The first use of cobalt cancer therapy in 1957
- The first use of electromagnetic imaging in 1974
- The first lithotripsy to treat kidney stones in 1985
- The first use of teleradiology to treat off-site patients in 1995

== Affiliations ==
The hospital is affiliated with several other hospitals and health care organizations in the region:

- Seattle Children's Hospital
- Pacific Medical Center

== Graduate medical education ==
Virginia Mason Medical Center operates several residency training programs for newly graduated physicians (MD and DO). The residencies are fully accredited by the Accreditation Council for Graduate Medical Education. Programs include: anesthesiology, diagnostic radiology, general surgery, urology and internal medicine. Further fellowship programs are also offered in cardiology, gastroenterology, rheumatology, urogynecology, regional anesthesia, and pain medicine.

== Problems ==
The hospital documented infections with carbapenem resistant enterobacteriaceae between November 2012 and March 2014, and in November 2013 officially confirmed an outbreak. Infections were linked to duodenoscopes, an endoscope used during a gastroenterology procedure called ERCP that enters the mouth, passes the stomach and ends in the duodenum. An abstract submitted to an infectious-disease society conference was presented in October 2014. CBS reported that at least 35 patients fell ill and 11 died, but it was not clear how much could be attributed to the bacteria, because "most patients who underwent the procedure already were critically ill with colon or pancreatic cancer".

In June 2016, Virginia Mason was denied full accreditation after an inspection by the Joint Commission determined that the hospital was failing compliance in 29 of its standards. However, Virginia Mason remains accredited pending a follow-up review by the Joint Commission, and at no time did it lose accreditation.
