= List of hospitals in Washington (state) =

This is a list of hospitals in the U.S. state of Washington, sorted by city and hospital name.

The first hospital in the modern-day state of Washington was established at Fort Vancouver in 1858, serving fur traders and local indigenous people.

== Hospitals ==
Hospital	City	County	Hospital beds	Trauma designation (adult)	Trauma (pediatric)	Affiliation	Founded
Arbor Health (formerly Morton General Hospital)	Morton	Lewis	25	V		Washington Rural Health Collaborative	1937
Astria Sunnyside Hospital	Sunnyside	Yakima	25	IV		Astria	
Astria Toppenish Hospital	Toppenish	Yakima	63	IV		Astria	1951
Capital Medical Center	Olympia	Thurston	110	IV		MultiCare Health	1985
Cascade Medical Center	Leavenworth	Chelan	17	V			
Cascade Valley Hospital	Arlington	Snohomish	48	IV		Skagit Regional Health	1901
Columbia Basin Hospital	Ephrata	Grant	50	V		Northwest Rural Health Network	1950
Confluence Health Hospital, Central Campus (formerly Central Washington Hospital)	Wenatchee	Chelan	206	III	III	Confluence Health	
Coulee Medical Center	Grand Coulee	Grant	25	IV		Northwest Rural Health Network	1934
Dayton General Hospital	Dayton	Columbia	25	V		Northwest Rural Health Network	
East Adams Rural Healthcare	Ritzville	Adams	20	V		Northwest Rural Health Network	
EvergreenHealth Medical Center	Kirkland	King	318	III		EvergreenHealth	
EvergreenHealth Monroe	Monroe	Snohomish	112	IV		EvergreenHealth	
Ferry County Memorial Hospital	Republic	Ferry	25	V		Northwest Rural Health Network	
Forks Community Hospital	Forks	Clallam	35	IV		Washington Rural Health Collaborative	
Garfield County Public Hospital	Pomeroy	Garfield	25	V		Northwest Rural Health Network	
Grays Harbor Community Hospital	Aberdeen	Grays Harbor	70	III		Harbor Medical Group	1959
Harborview Medical Center	Seattle	King	413	I	I	UW Medicine	1877
Island Hospital	Anacortes	Skagit	43	III		Washington Rural Health Collaborative	1962
Jefferson Healthcare Hospital	Port Townsend	Jefferson	25	IV		Washington Rural Health Collaborative	1890
Kadlec Regional Medical Center	Richland	Benton	270	III		Kadlec	
Kaiser Permanente Capitol Hill	Seattle	King	18			Kaiser	formerly Group Health Cooperative Central Hospital
Kindred Hospital Seattle - First Hill	Seattle	King	50			Kindred Healthcare	LTACH
Kindred Hospital Seattle - North Gate	Seattle	King	30			Kindred Healthcare	LTACH
Kittitas Valley Healthcare	Ellensburg	Kittitas	25	IV		Formerly Kittitas Valley Community Hospital	1964
Klickitat Valley Health	Goldendale	Klickitat	17	IV		Washington Rural Health Collaborative	
Lake Chelan Community Hospital	Chelan	Chelan	24	IV		LCCHC	
Legacy Salmon Creek Hospital	Vancouver	Clark	194			Legacy Health	2005
Lincoln Hospital	Davenport	Lincoln	25	V		Northwest Rural Health Network	1961
Lourdes Counseling Center	Richland	Benton	32			LifePoint Health	
Lourdes Medical Center	Pasco	Franklin	25	IV		LifePoint Health	
Madigan Army Medical Center	Tacoma	Pierce	205	II		Military Health System	1944
Mary Bridge Children's Hospital	Tacoma	Pierce	72	II		MultiCare Health	1955
Mason General Hospital	Shelton	Mason	25	IV		Washington Rural Health Collaborative	
Mid-Valley Hospital	Omak	Okanogan	30	IV			1963
MultiCare Allenmore Hospital	Tacoma	Pierce	130	IV		MultiCare Health	
MultiCare Auburn Medical Center	Auburn	King	162	III		MultiCare Health	1921
MultiCare Covington	Covington	King	58			MultiCare Health	2018
MultiCare Deaconess Hospital	Spokane	Spokane	307	III		MultiCare Health	
MultiCare Good Samaritan Hospital	Puyallup	Pierce	275	III		MultiCare Health	
MultiCare Tacoma General Hospital	Tacoma	Pierce	437	II		MultiCare Health	1882
MultiCare Valley Hospital	Spokane Valley	Spokane	123	III		MultiCare Health	
Naval Hospital Bremerton	Bremerton	Kitsap	40			Military Health System	
Newport Community Hospital	Newport	Pend Oreille	75	IV		Washington Rural Health Collaborative & Northwest Rural Health Network	
North Valley Hospital	Tonasket	Okanogan	25	IV			
Northwest Hospital	Seattle	King	281	IV		UW Medicine	1960
Ocean Beach Hospital	Ilwaco	Pacific	15	IV		Washington Rural Health Collaborative	1934
Odessa Memorial Healthcare Center	Odessa	Lincoln	48	V		Northwest Rural Health Network	
Olympic Memorial Hospital	Port Angeles	Clallam	126	III			1951
Othello Community Hospital	Othello	Adams	25	V		Northwest Rural Health Network	1958
Overlake Hospital Medical Center	Bellevue	King	347	III		MultiCare Health	1960
PeaceHealth Peace Island Hospital	Friday Harbor	San Juan	10			PeaceHealth (Catholic)	
PeaceHealth St. John Medical Center	Longview	Cowlitz	193	III		PeaceHealth (Catholic)	
PeaceHealth St. Joseph Medical Center	Bellingham	Whatcom	253	II		PeaceHealth (Catholic)	
PeaceHealth Southwest Medical Center	Vancouver	Clark	450	II	II	PeaceHealth (Catholic)	1858
PeaceHealth United General Medical Center	Sedro-Woolley	Skagit	25	IV		PeaceHealth (Catholic)	
Prosser Memorial Hospital	Prosser	Benton	25	IV		Washington Rural Health Collaborative	
Providence Centralia Hospital	Centralia	Lewis	133	IV		Providence Health (Catholic)	
Providence Holy Family Hospital	Spokane	Spokane	272	III	III	Providence Health (Catholic)	
Providence Mount Carmel Hospital	Colville	Stevens	25	IV		Providence Health (Catholic)	
Providence Regional Medical Center Everett	Everett	Snohomish	468	II	III	Providence Health (Catholic)	1994
Providence Sacred Heart Medical Center	Spokane	Spokane	644	II	II	Providence Health (Catholic)	1856
Providence St. Joseph's Hospital	Chewelah	Stevens	70	IV		Providence Health (Catholic)	
Providence St. Mary Medical Center	Walla Walla	Walla Walla	87	III		Providence Health (Catholic)	
Providence St. Peter Hospital	Olympia	Thurston	372	III		Providence Health (Catholic)	1887
Pullman Regional Hospital	Pullman	Whitman	25	IV		Northwest Rural Health Network	
Quincy Valley Medical Center	Quincy	Grant	25	V			
St. Anne Hospital (formerly Highline Medical Center)	Burien	King	164	IV		Franciscan Health (Catholic)	1958, independent until 2013
St. Anthony Hospital	Gig Harbor	Pierce	80	IV		Franciscan Health (Catholic)	2009
St. Clare Hospital	Lakewood	Pierce	106	IV		Franciscan Health (Catholic)	1961
St. Elizabeth Hospital	Enumclaw	King	38	V		Franciscan Health (Catholic)	1949
St. Francis Hospital	Federal Way	King	110	IV		Franciscan Health (Catholic)	1987
St. Joseph Medical Center	Tacoma	Pierce	343	II		Franciscan Health (Catholic)	1891
St. Luke's Rehabilitation Institute	Spokane	Spokane	102			Inland Northwest Helt	Rehab
St. Michaels Medical Center (formerly Harrison Medical Center)	Silverdale	Kitsap	248	III		Franciscan Health (Catholic)	1918
Samaritan Healthcare	Moses Lake	Grant	50	III		Northwest Rural Health Network	
Seattle Cancer Care Alliance	Seattle	King	20				
Seattle Children's	Seattle	King	407		I PED	Children's Miracle Network	1907
Seattle VA Medical Center	Seattle	King	429			Veterans Health Administration	
Shriners Hospital for Children	Spokane	Spokane	30			Shriners Hospitals for Children	
Skagit Valley Hospital	Mount Vernon	Skagit	137	III		Skagit Regional Health	1958
Skyline Hospital	White Salmon	Klickitat	25	IV		Washington Rural Health Collaborative	
Snoqualmie Valley Hospital	Snoqualmie	King	25	V		Washington Rural Health Collaborative	
Summit Pacific Medical Center	McCleary	Grays Harbor	11	V		Washington Rural Health Collaborative	
Swedish Medical Center Ballard	Seattle	King	163			Providence Health (Catholic)	
Swedish Medical Center Cherry Hill	Seattle	King	385			Providence Health (Catholic)	
Swedish Medical Center Edmonds	Edmonds	Snohomish	217	IV		Providence Health (Catholic)	1964
Swedish Medical Center First Hill	Seattle	King	697			Providence Health (Catholic)	
Swedish Medical Center Issaquah	Issaquah	King	120			Providence Health (Catholic)	
Three Rivers Hospital	Brewster	Okanogan	35	IV			1959
Tri-State Memorial Hospital	Clarkston	Asotin	25	IV		Northwest Rural Health Network	
Trios Health	Kennewick	Benton	111	III		LifePoint Health	
University of Washington Medical Center	Seattle	King	450			UW Medicine	1959
Valley Medical Center	Renton	King	303	III		UW Medicine	Formed an alliance with the University of Washington in 2011
Virginia Mason Hospital	Seattle	King	336			Virginia Mason Health System merged with Franciscan Health (CHI Franciscan and Virginia Mason merger)	
Wenatchee Valley Medical Center	Wenatchee	Chelan	20			Confluence Health	
WhidbeyHealth Medical Center	Coupeville	Island	25	III		Washington Rural Health Collaborative	1970
Whitman Hospital and Medical Center	Colfax	Whitman	25	V		Northwest Rural Health Network	1893
Willapa Harbor Hospital	South Bend	Pacific	15	IV		Washington Rural Health Collaborative	
Yakima Valley Memorial Hospital	Yakima	Yakima	222		III	III	Virginia Mason Health System

== Psychiatric facilities ==
Hospital	County	City	Bed count	Founded	Affiliation	Notes
Eastern State Hospital	Spokane	Medical Lake	312	1891		
Fairfax Hospital	King	Kirkland	95	1930		
Inland Northwest Behavioral Health	Spokane	Spokane	100	2018	Universal Health Services	
Navos Health	King	Seattle	70			Formerly West Seattle Psychiatric Hospital
Rainier Springs	Clark	Vancouver	72	2018	Springstone	
Western State Hospital	Pierce	Lakewood	806	1871		

== Sanatoriums ==
Hospital	County	City	Bed count	Trauma center	Founded	Closed	Notes
Aldercrest Sanatorium	Snohomish	Everett			1918	1954	
Blue Mountain Sanatorium	Walla Walla	Walla Walla			1935	1954	
Central Washington Tuberculosis Hospital	Yakima	Selah			1950	1958	Now known as Yakima Valley School
Edgecliff Hospital	Spokane	Spokane			1915	1978	Also known as Edgecliff Sanatorium
Firland Sanatorium	King	Seattle			1910	1973	
Lake Forest Park Sanatorium	King	Seattle			1942	1943	
Laurel Beach Sanatorium	King	Seattle			1920	1957	
MacMillian Sanatorium	Lewis	Chehalis			1943	1954	
Oakhurst Sanatorium	Grays Harbor	Elma			1921	1954	
Sunnyview Sanatorium	Kitsap	Port Orchard				1952	

== Former hospitals ==
Hospital	County	City	Bed count	Trauma center	Founded	Closed	Notes
Astria Regional Medical Center	Yakima	Yakima	150	III		2019	
City Emergency Hospital	King	Seattle			1909	1951	Located in 400 Yesler Building
Deer Park Hospital	Spokane	Deer Park	24			2008	
Doctors Hospital	King	Seattle				1970s	Merged with Swedish Hospital
Doctors Hospital	Pierce	Tacoma			1946	1988	
Grace Hospital	King	Seattle	40		1887	1894	
Group Health Eastside Hospital	King	Redmond				2008	
Highline Community Hospital Specialty Center	Tukwila	King	30			2014	
New Wayside Emergency Hospital	King	Seattle			1907	1913	
Northern State Hospital	Skagit	Sedro Woolley	2000		1912	1973	State mental health facility
Puget Sound Hospital	Pierce	Tacoma			1905	2010	Also known as Northern Pacific Hospital, Pierce County General Hospital, and Puget Sound General Hospital. Absorbed Mountain View Hospital in 1958.
Regional Hospital for Respiratory and Complex Care	Burien	King	31			2019	Located within Highline Medical Center
Saint Cabrini Hospital	King	Seattle			1916	1990	Was located at southwest corner of Boren and Madison
St. Ignatius Hospital	Whitman	Colfax			1892	1964	
Waldo Hospital	King	Seattle	57		1924	1985	
Walla Walla General Hospital	Walla Walla	Walla Walla	72	III	1899	2017	
Wayside Emergency Hospital	King	Seattle	41		1899	1907	Located aboard paddle-wheel steamer Idaho; moved to Republican and 2nd Ave N and became New Wayside Emergency Hospital
West Seattle Community Hospital	King	Seattle				1990	
