= Waldo General Hospital (Seattle) =

Geography
- Location: Seattle, Washington, United States
- Coordinates: 47.6908°N 122.3129°W

Organization
- Care system: Private
- Funding: Non-profit hospital

Services
- Beds: 57

History
- Opened: 1924
- Closed: 1985

Links
- Lists: Hospitals in Washington state

Waldo General Hospital, also known as the Waldo Sanitarium, was a 57-bed hospital located in the Maple Leaf neighborhood in Seattle, Washington. The hospital was open in 1924 and closed in 1985.

== History ==
The hospital was founded by Seattle based Osteopath Dr. William Earl Waldo in 1924. The original campus was located at 8511 15th Ave NE. It was then relocated to 15th Ave NE & NE 85th St.

In November 1937, the hospital became non-profit and non-secritarian institution. In 1942, the hospital became a designated Osteopathy hospital. In August 1962, Dr. Waldo announced his retirement after over 50 years of medical practice. In September 1962, Dr. Stephen M. Pugh was named the administrator and medical director of the hospital.

In 1939, Waldo Hospital sued the Columbia Broadcasting Company for an alleged defamatory statements aired on KIRO. The case was later dismissed after the hospital withdrew their suit.

In 1959, a north wing was added to the hospital.

By 1977, the hospital employed about 200 personal. In the same year, the hospital became the first hospital to process its payroll through an Automated Clearing House (ACH) system.

In 1978, the Safadago family sued Waldo Hospital and was awarded $1.1 million in damages. The suit came about when their son suffered from brain and nerve damage when he was born in 1972.

The hospital closed in 1985.
