= Three Rivers Hospital =

Three Rivers Hospital is a hospital based in Brewster, Washington, United States, which is a city that is part of the Okanogan region.
