= Seattle Naval Hospital =

Geography
- Location: Shoreline, Washington, United States

Organisation
- Type: General

Services
- Beds: 1,500

History
- Constructed: March 1942
- Opened: August 1942
- Closed: After the end of World War II

Seattle Naval Hospital was a military hospital created during World War II in the city of Shoreline, Washington, for convalescing naval sailors in the Pacific Theater of the War. In 1945, there were over 2000 patients and 600 staff members at the hospital. After the war, the facility was converted into a tuberculosis sanitarium (Firland) until 1973. Since then the location has been used by the Washington State Department of Social and Health Services to house developmentally disabled adults.

During World War II, the only major development in Shoreline was the Naval Hospital. Seattle was chosen as the construction site due to a shortage of hospital beds. Construction took place between March and August 1942, and by July 20, 1943, the hospital had 500 beds. In 1945, it employed 15 doctors and surgeons as naval officers.

Joel Thompson Boone, a United States Navy officer, was the hospital's commandant. Eleanor Roosevelt, the first lady of the United States, visited the hospital several times to encourage the wounded.

In 1947, the hospital was transferred to King County and after a few years the original buildings were destroyed.

== See also ==
- List of United States Navy installations
