= Walla Walla General Hospital =

- Adventist Health

Geography
- Location: Walla Walla, Washington, United States
- Coordinates: 46.0552°N 118.3297°W

Organization
- Care system: Private

Services
- Beds: 72

History
- Founded: 1899

Links
- Lists: Hospitals in Washington state

Walla Walla General Hospital was a 72-bed acute-care hospital located at the base of the Blue Mountains and served approximately 70,000 residents of Southeastern Washington and Northeastern Oregon. It was closed after more than 100 years in operation in the month of July 2017, Adventist Health's Walla Walla General Hospital in eastern Washington and they also closed their Adventist Home Healthcare related services, and their clinics.

== History ==
In 1899, Isaac and Maggie Dunlap returned to the Walla Walla Valley after completing studies at the Battle Creek Sanitarium located in Michigan. They opened treatment rooms in the basement of the administration building at Walla Walla College. During the first year, some 3,000 patients were treated. In 1903, they built a structure that doubled as their home and a sanitarium and in 1906, they purchased the old College Place public schoolhouse. This structure was moved to the Walla Walla College campus, hoisted up and a new first floor was built underneath it. It was dedicated on June 3, 1907.

The first female physician, Dr. Runck, joined staff in 1910 and within the next few years extensive improvements were made to the "department devoted to women's medicated baths." The building was expanded three times in 12 years and by the early 1920s the sanitarium had grown to a three-story building.

In 1925, a group of local physicians opened a rival hospital. Built at the cost of $200,000, it contained the latest in medical equipment and facilities. However, the Great Depression caused the rival hospital to go bankrupt and it was auctioned in a sheriff's sale in 1931, and was purchased by the Walla Walla Sanitarium for $75,000.

The 1940s saw a boom in census after the lean years of the Great Depression. In the hospital's 1943 annual report, the manager stated that bed capacity was 53, with an average of 49.6 patients per day. In 1950, the community was challenged to raise one-third of the proposed $385,000 needed for expansion. A new west wing was added in 1956, and in the 1960s, the hospital was remodeled and technologically updated.

In the early 1970s, another renovation was necessary. The needs of the institution, now known as Walla Walla General Hospital (WWGH), were presented to the community and they pledged one-third of the needed $750,000. The hospital board also decided to relocate entirely than build onto the original building. During the process, WWGH joined Adventist Health on December 9, 1973. On September 18, 1975, groundbreaking ceremonies were held at WWGH's current location. Two years later, on July 10, 1977, the grand opening of the new facility was held.

In June 2001 a surprise FDA inspection found problems with the technical controls in the hospital's autologous blood bank and further problems were found in December 2002, but a followup in April 2003 verified that all the problems had been corrected.

On July 24, 2017, Walla Walla General Hospital closed. At the time of its closure it was part of Adventist Health.
