= Edgecliff Hospital =

Former tuberculosis sanatorium in Spokane, Washington

Geography
- Location: 601 S. Park Rd, Spokane, Washington, United States
- Coordinates: 47°39′9″N 117°18′9″W

Organization
- Funding: Public hospital
- Type: Sanatorium

Services
- Beds: 200+

History
- Opened: 1915
- Closed: 1978

Links
- Lists: Hospitals in Washington state

Edgecliff Hospital, also known as the Edgecliff Sanatorium, was a tuberculosis sanatorium located in Spokane, Washington, United States. The sanatorium was opened in 1915 and closed in 1978.

== History ==
Construction of the Edgecliff Sanatorium began in 1914. The building was designed by architect Archibald G. Rigg, who also worked on several other hospitals and buildings in the Spokane area. The sanatorium was officially opened on October 9, 1915, and the opening ceremony was attended by over 150 people. Spokane's mayor at the time, Charles M. Fassett was one of five speakers at the ceremony. The first patients admitted were transferred from the county's poor farm in Spangle.

The first death to occur at the sanatorium was 35 year old Agnes Graham on October 30, 1915. She was born in Australia and died about a week after her admission to the hospital.

A children's wing opened in October 1917. Another wing of the hospital was added in 1919 for the cost of $110,000. This addition added 89 beds for a total of 171 beds. Another wing was added in 1949. It contained 66 beds, a surgical suite, and an occupational therapy wing. This new wing was fireproof. At its peak, the hospital treated up to 210 patients suffering from tuberculosis. It served Spokane County and 19 other surrounding counties in Eastern Washington.

In February 1961, two of the older hospital buildings were damaged by fire. No patients were harmed in the fire, and the cause was unknown. The hospital underwent a $230,000 remodel in 1962.

By the 1970s, the patient load had dropped to about 30 a year. In December 1970, funds for the hospital were cut from $414,000 to $300,000 by the Washington State Department of Health. Prior to the cut, Edgecliff was spending $31.50 per day on patients. In comparison, Firland Sanatorium in Seattle was spending $42 per patient in the same period. Other hospitals of the same type were operating on a budget of $60 a day per patient. In 1975, the Washington State Legislature voted to cut state funding to the hospital. The state began to transfer patients to other hospitals or to their homes for care in late 1977, with this move being complete by December 16, 1977. The hospital was officially closed on January 1, 1978. At the time of its closure, it was the last tuberculosis sanatorium left in Washington State.

== Post-closure ==
The hospital served as an alcohol treatment center named Spokane Community Alcohol Center from 1978 to 1981. This facility was run by Spokane County. In 1987, Spokane County sold the hospital to real estate investor named John Jacks. He put down $20,000 on the property, with the promise to pay the county an additional $330,000 within 10 months following the purchase. He intended to develop the property into restaurants and office buildings. By November 1988, Jacks was unable to find investors, and the property was put back up for sale by Spokane County. The hospital sat vacant until 1991, when the property was bought by developer Harry Green. Green renovated the hospital and opened it as a senior living facility named Park Place. The building is currently owned by Brookdale Senior Living, who operate Brookdale Park Place out of the former hospital.

== Staff ==
From 1917 to 1957, Dr. F. S. Miller served as the facilities medical director. In 1957, Dr. George W. Rodkey became the hospital's medical director. He remained in this position until the hospital closed in 1978.

In 1946, Rena Smith became the superintendent of nursing before retiring in 1966. She joined the staff at Edgecliff in 1932. She was replaced as superintendent by Mearle Roy.
