= Brewster, Washington =

Brewster
- City
- City of Brewster
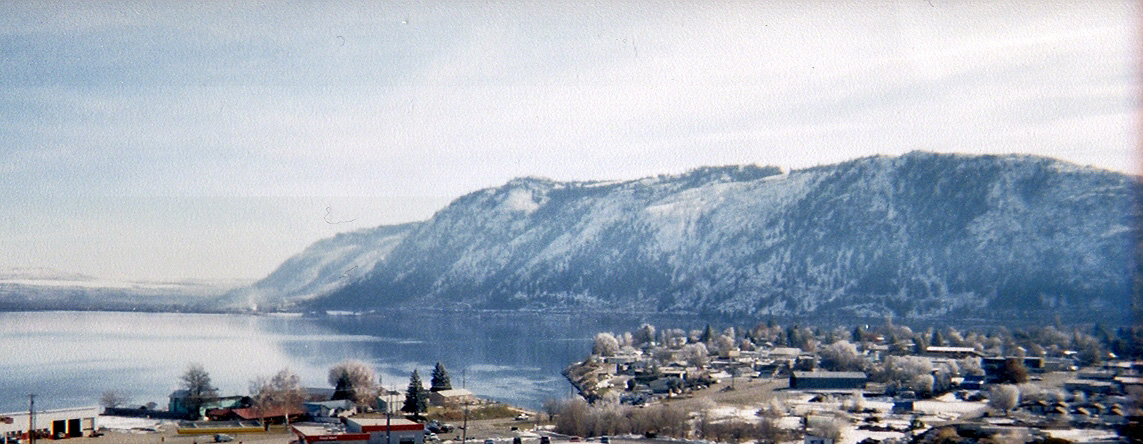
- The outskirts of Brewster

- Location of Brewster, Washington
- Coordinates: 48°06′10″N 119°45′19″W
- Country: United States
- State: Washington
- County: Okanogan

Government
  - Mayor: Art Smyth

Area
  - Total: 1.51 sq mi (3.90 km^{2})
  - Land: 1.15 sq mi (2.98 km^{2})
  - Water: 0.36 sq mi (0.92 km^{2})
- Elevation: 784 ft (239 m)

Population (2020)
  - Total: 1,983
  - Density: 1,720/sq mi (665/km^{2})
- Time zone: UTC-8 (Pacific (PST))
  - Summer (DST): UTC-7 (PDT)
- ZIP code: 98812
- Area code: 509
- FIPS code: 53-07835
- GNIS feature ID: 2409903
- Website: City of Brewster

Brewster is a city in Okanogan County, Washington, United States. The population was 1,983 at the 2020 census.

== History ==
Brewster was founded in 1896. A post office called Brewster has been in operation since 1898. The city derives its name from John Bruster, a pioneer settler.

== Geography ==
Brewster is located on the confluence of the Okanogan and Columbia Rivers.

According to the United States Census Bureau, the city has a total area of 1.19 square miles (3.08 km^{2}), all of it land. The 30–bed Three Rivers Hospital serves the city as the largest hospital in the county. The radio telescope located in Brewster is the northernmost of ten dishes comprising the Very Long Baseline Array.

== Demographics ==
Historical population
| Census | Pop. | Note | %± |
|---|---|---|---|
| 1910 | 296 | | — |
| 1920 | 394 | | 33.1% |
| 1930 | 413 | | 4.8% |
| 1940 | 447 | | 8.2% |
| 1950 | 851 | | 90.4% |
| 1960 | 940 | | 10.5% |
| 1970 | 1,059 | | 12.7% |
| 1980 | 1,337 | | 26.3% |
| 1990 | 1,633 | | 22.1% |
| 2000 | 2,189 | | 34.0% |
| 2010 | 2,370 | | 8.3% |
| 2020 | 1,983 | | −16.3% |
U.S. Decennial Census; 2020 Census

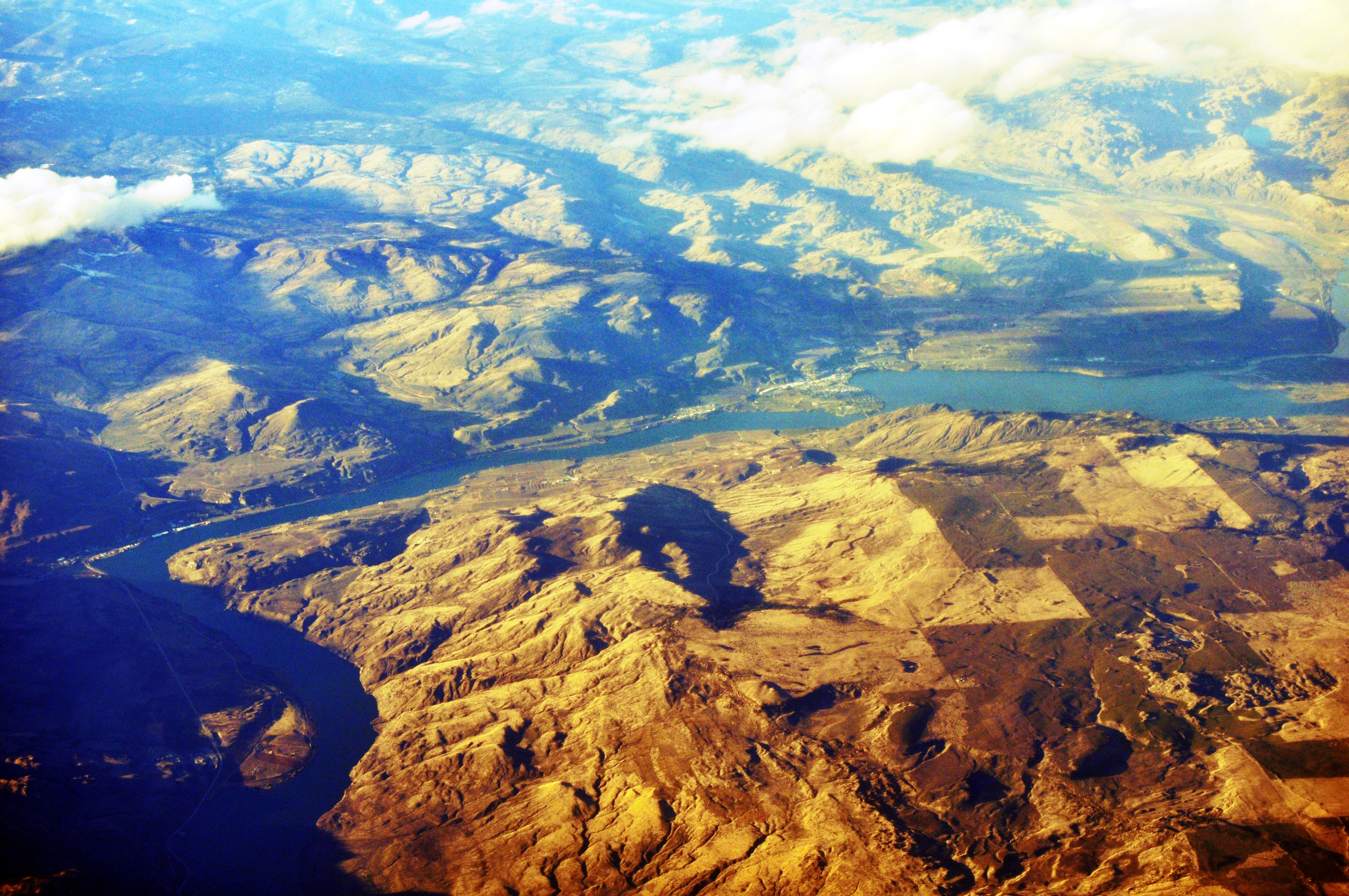
An aerial view of Brewster, adjacent to the Columbia River.

=== Racial and ethnic composition ===
Racial composition as of the 2020 census
| Race | Number | Percent |
|---|---|---|
| White | 582 | 29.3% |
| Black or African American | 10 | 0.5% |
| American Indian and Alaska Native | 39 | 2.0% |
| Asian | 6 | 0.3% |
| Native Hawaiian and Other Pacific Islander | 3 | 0.2% |
| Some other race | 930 | 46.9% |
| Two or more races | 413 | 20.8% |
| Hispanic or Latino (of any race) | 1,528 | 77.1% |

=== 2020 census ===
As of the 2020 census, Brewster had a population of 1,983. The median age was 33.0 years. 31.5% of residents were under the age of 18 and 12.8% of residents were 65 years of age or older. For every 100 females there were 96.5 males, and for every 100 females age 18 and over there were 93.6 males age 18 and over.

0.0% of residents lived in urban areas, while 100.0% lived in rural areas.

There were 632 households in Brewster, of which 46.0% had children under the age of 18 living in them. Of all households, 50.5% were married-couple households, 17.6% were households with a male householder and no spouse or partner present, and 26.3% were households with a female householder and no spouse or partner present. About 23.6% of all households were made up of individuals and 9.3% had someone living alone who was 65 years of age or older.

There were 715 housing units, of which 11.6% were vacant. The homeowner vacancy rate was 0.0% and the rental vacancy rate was 10.4%.

=== 2010 census ===
As of the 2010 census, there were 2,370 people, 699 households, and 535 families living in the city. The population density was 1,991.6 inhabitants per square mile (769.0/km^{2}). There were 730 housing units at an average density of 613.4 per square mile (236.8/km^{2}). The racial makeup of the city was 50.8% White, 0.3% African American, 2.2% Native American, 0.2% Asian, 43.0% from other races, and 3.5% from two or more races. Hispanic or Latino of any race were 73.0% of the population.

There were 699 households, of which 54.5% had children under the age of 18 living with them, 52.9% were married couples living together, 15.6% had a female householder with no husband present, 8.0% had a male householder with no wife present, and 23.5% were non-families. 20.5% of all households were made up of individuals, and 10% had someone living alone who was 65 years of age or older. The average household size was 3.31 and the average family size was 3.81.

The median age in the city was 27.6 years. 35.1% of residents were under the age of 18; 11.1% were between the ages of 18 and 24; 26.4% were from 25 to 44; 17.2% were from 45 to 64; and 10% were 65 years of age or older. The gender makeup of the city was 50.4% male and 49.6% female. For population 25 years and older, 50.2% have a high school diploma or higher, 8.1% have a bachelor's degree or higher, and 3.4% have a graduate or professional degree.

== Climate ==
Climate data for Brewster, Washington
| Month | Jan | Feb | Mar | Apr | May | Jun | Jul | Aug | Sep | Oct | Nov | Dec | Year |
|---|---|---|---|---|---|---|---|---|---|---|---|---|---|
| Record high °F (°C) | 57 (14) | 64 (18) | 78 (26) | 93 (34) | 103 (39) | 108 (42) | 110 (43) | 110 (43) | 103 (39) | 86 (30) | 75 (24) | 59 (15) | 110 (43) |
| Mean daily maximum °F (°C) | 35 (2) | 42 (6) | 55 (13) | 65 (18) | 74 (23) | 81 (27) | 90 (32) | 90 (32) | 80 (27) | 63 (17) | 45 (7) | 34 (1) | 63 (17) |
| Mean daily minimum °F (°C) | 23 (−5) | 26 (−3) | 32 (0) | 38 (3) | 45 (7) | 52 (11) | 58 (14) | 57 (14) | 48 (9) | 37 (3) | 30 (−1) | 22 (−6) | 39 (4) |
| Record low °F (°C) | −19 (−28) | −19 (−28) | 2 (−17) | 19 (−7) | 26 (−3) | 33 (1) | 35 (2) | 35 (2) | 29 (−2) | 10 (−12) | −9 (−23) | −19 (−28) | −19 (−28) |
| Average precipitation inches (mm) | 1.38 (35) | 1.09 (28) | 0.90 (23) | 0.55 (14) | 0.96 (24) | 0.90 (23) | 0.56 (14) | 0.26 (6.6) | 0.39 (9.9) | 0.60 (15) | 1.43 (36) | 1.86 (47) | 10.88 (275.5) |

== Education ==
The city is served by the Brewster School District.
