= Firland Sanatorium =

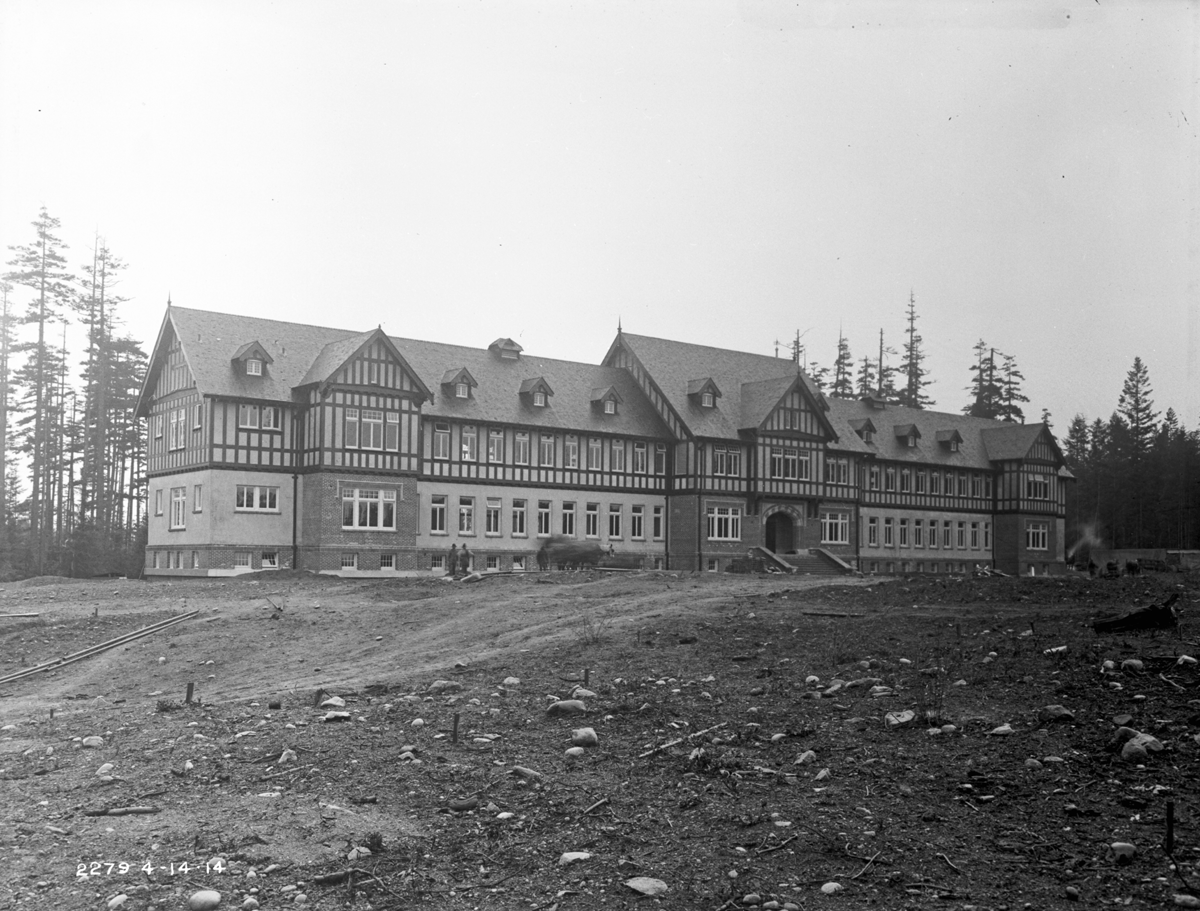
- Firland Tuberculosis Hospital, 1914

Geography
- Location: Seattle, Washington, United States
- Coordinates: 47.7694°N 122.3540°W

Organization
- Type: Community
- Patron: Horace C. Henry

History
- Founded: 1910
- Closed: 1947 (relocated)

Links
- Lists: Hospitals in Washington state

The Firland Sanatorium was Seattle's municipal tuberculosis treatment center. It opened on May 2, 1911, and closed on October 30, 1973.

== Early history ==
Firland was established in what is now the city of Shoreline, Washington under the original name of Henry Sanatorium. Horace Henry, a railroad magnate, was one of the leading founders of Firland. He donated 34 acres of land and $25,000 to build the sanatorium. In the spring of 1910, Seattle residents voted in favor of a $10,000 bond to aid in construction. A larger bond supporting the institute passed in 1912.

When Firland opened, patients initially slept in open-air cottages. Three more buildings were added in 1913; the main administration offices operated in the Walter H. Henry Memorial Building, the Detweiler Building housed tubercular patients, and non-tubercular patients with other infectious diseases were housed in Jenner Hall. In 1920, the Koch and Nightingale buildings were erected to treat ambulant patients. In 1925, Josef House was added to treat children with tuberculosis or family members with tuberculosis.

The medical director of Firland was Dr. Robert M. Stith from its inception until his death in 1943. He also directed a free public health clinic in downtown Seattle and was the authority on who was admitted to Firland. Those that could afford it were urged to admit themselves to private sanatoriums, like Laurel Beach or Riverton. To be admitted to Firland, patients had to have lived in Seattle for at least one year, and their chance at recovery needed to be reasonable. These criteria were enforced in order to rule out transients. Women with children were often prioritized over single individuals or those without children. If no one could care for the children at home, they were taken to Josef House for treatment or preventive care. The cost of care was paid for by the State of Washington and the Seattle Department of Health. 80% of Seattle's tuberculosis patients were cared for at home, not in sanatoriums. Nurses from the Health Department made house visits to care for these patients.

Firland was self-sustaining, due to its own well, power plant, orchards and vegetable gardens on campus.

It operated in its Shoreline location from 1911 until 1947, when it was relocated to a decommissioned naval hospital at 15th Avenue Northeast and 150th Street in Seattle. The original Shoreline location is now occupied by the headquarters of Crista Ministries.

== Treatment process ==
=== Rest and behavioral treatment ===
First and foremost, Firland prescribed rest for its tuberculosis patients. "Rest – more rest – and still more rest. Rest is the keynote. Rest for the body, rest for the mind. Rest from involuntary as well as voluntary activity forms the basis on which the cure is built". Character and willpower were emphasized in the recovery process. Upon admission to Firland, all patients entered the bedrest hospital. Patients were not permitted to read, write, speak, or cough. Coughing was prohibited because it was feared that it would start a coughing frenzy among other patients. Coughing was only permitted to produce a sputum sample for testing. Because fresh air was considered to be key in the treatment of tuberculosis, windows were kept open all year long. In addition to fresh air, nourishment was also extremely important, and hearty meals were provided for all patients.

=== Surgical intervention ===
Surgical intervention was used in some cases of tuberculosis. An artificial pneumothorax involved pumping air into the space between the lung and the ribcage. Thoracoplasty was prescribed for some patients; the removal of ribs so that the chest wall would compress around the lung. the ultimate goal of artificial pneumothorax and thoracoplasty was to render the lungs as still as possible.

=== Occupational therapy ===
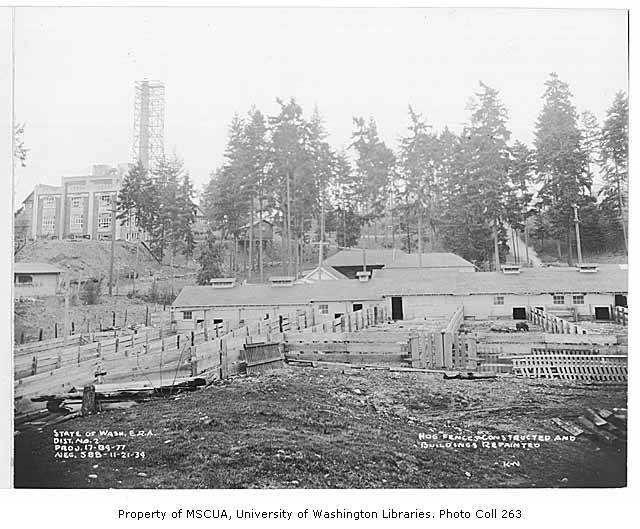
Firland Sanatorium and Hog Farm, 1934

After a patient had completed their stay in the bed rest hospital, they were allowed "time up". Patients were able to get out of bed and assume a job in the hospital. In addition to giving them vocational training, this allowed Firland's doctors to observe the patients and monitor their recovery. The maximum time patients were allowed to be up was 8 hours. After this, they were expected to spend the other 16 hours of the day resting.

Occupational therapy positions at Firland included delivering mail, tending the library, pushing wheelchairs, or cooking food in the dining hall. Patients also staffed the woodshop, print shop, domestic arts center, machine shop, beauty parlor, vegetable gardens, farm (raising eggs, poultry, and pork) and volunteer fire department, all on Firland's grounds.

Patients at Firland also produced a magazine called Grit and Grin. According to HistoryLink, "its purpose was to educate and inform patients and to boost morale". The magazine listed birthdays, admissions, and discharges, as well as jokes and literary pieces.

== Notable patients ==
Notable patients of Firland Sanatorium include:

- Betty MacDonald
- Hazel Wolf
- Charlie France
- William Cumming
- Beatrice Roethke
- Monica Sone

== Final years ==
Firland's nursing staff dwindled to 1/3 of its previous size during World War II, as nurses left to help war efforts. The case finding program was eliminated due to a lack of funds and available staff. The occupational therapy program grew to include scale-model aircraft production, to be used as teaching tools about enemy planes. Other patients knit clothing for soldiers.

In 1943 King County took over Firland's operations and, in 1947, moved the hospital to its new campus in a decommissioned Naval Hospital at 15th Avenue NE and 150th Street in Seattle. The number of beds increased to a total of 1350, allowing every person on the waitlist to be admitted at once. Three new antibiotic drugs were introduced to the cure for tuberculosis in 1947: Streptomycin, Para-amino Salicylic Acid, and isoniazid. Tuberculosis was quick to become antibiotic-resistant, so rest and nutrition remained on the treatment plan. The average stay at Firland had been cut in half by 1954, and mortality rates dropped from 31% in 1948 to 6% in 1954. National officials called Firland "one of the most outstanding sanatoria in the country". In 1957, only 600 of Firland's 1,310 beds were occupied by patients. Patients at Firland began to behave with less docility than in the past due to the high recovery rates and changing social expectations after World War II. Ward rules were relaxed, such as the extreme separation of sexes. Patient needs were addressed by newly hired social workers, psychologists, and psychiatrists.

Total cure for tuberculosis was in sight, and doctors moved forward with eradicating the disease by identifying and treating every single case of tuberculosis, whether the patients liked it or not. In the 1950s, the presence of tuberculosis in alcoholics was especially problematic for the total eradication of the disease. Firland formed its own chapter of Alcoholics Anonymous in 1950; however, alcoholic patients were forcibly isolated so that they did not leave the hospital before they were cured. Alcoholics were kept in Ward Six. It had windows with heavy screens and locked doors. There were concrete slabs with thin mattresses for beds, and were referred to as cells instead of rooms. By the mid-1950s, 10% of Firland's patients had been involuntarily detained, though Ward Six was used sparingly when it was first opened. Alcoholics were made to stay at Firland for one year, even if their sputum culture was negative. There was no formal process to ensure an alcoholic patient stayed in the sanatorium, though it fell in line with the Health Department's quarantine regulations. They had not previously been enforced due to a lack of available beds. Patients classified as "difficult" were also put in Ward Six to maintain order and punish those who broke rules. By 1957, Firland was investigated by the Washington chapter of the American Civil Liberties Union. In 1965, monthly hearings were held by District Court Judge Robert M. Elston to identify and address the needs of patients confined to Ward Six. When Washington state took over financial responsibility for Firland in 1971, one third of Firland patients were being forcibly quarantined.

Firland's final day in operation was October 30, 1973. The tuberculosis epidemic in Washington state was winding down, and Firland patients were consolidated with Mountain View Hospital patients in Tacoma. Tuberculosis began to be treated with outpatient procedures instead of total relegation to a ward.
