= List of YWCA buildings =

This is a list of notable YWCA buildings. YWCA buildings are prominent in many cities.

== Australia ==
- Grand Central Hotel, a.k.a. Grand Central YWCA, Grand Hotel, Grand Central Coffee Palace, at 379 Wellington St. in Perth, Western Australia, Western Australia State Heritage-listed

== Canada ==
- Y des Femmes de Montréal (YWCA Montreal), (Montréal, Québec, Canada). Built in 1875, moved to its current building on 1355 Boulevard René-Lévesque West in 1952.

== Great Britain ==
- Ames House, 44 Mortimer Street, Camden borough of London, built in 1904, designed by Beresford Pite, the first "major" YWCA building of the YWCA in London, which had operated from 1857, a Heritage site.
- Queen Mary Hall and YWCA Central Club, a Grade II listed building, built during 1928–32, designed by Sir Edwin Lutyens, on Great Russell Street, also in Camden borough of London.

== New Zealand ==
- YWCA building, 268 Madras St., Christchurch. Built in 1914. A category 2 historic place (#1951). Demolished in 2011.

== United States ==
In the United States, many are listed on the U.S. National Register of Historic Places (NRHP). A 1997 article covered all the YWCA buildings listed at that time.

(by state then city)

- YWCA Building (Fresno, California), NRHP-listed
- YWCA Activity Unit, Fresno, California, NRHP-listed
- Hollywood Studio Club, Hollywood, Los Angeles, California, NRHP-listed
- YWCA Building (Oakland, California), listed on the NRHP in Alameda County, California
- Hostess House, Palo Alto, California, listed on the NRHP in Santa Clara County
- Old YWCA Building (Riverside, California), listed on the NRHP in Riverside County, California
- Japanese YWCA Building, NRHP-listed in San Francisco, California
- Young Women's Christian Association (Pueblo, Colorado), listed on the NRHP in Pueblo County, Colorado
- Young Women's Christian Association Complex, Athens, Georgia, listed on the NRHP in Clarke County, Georgia

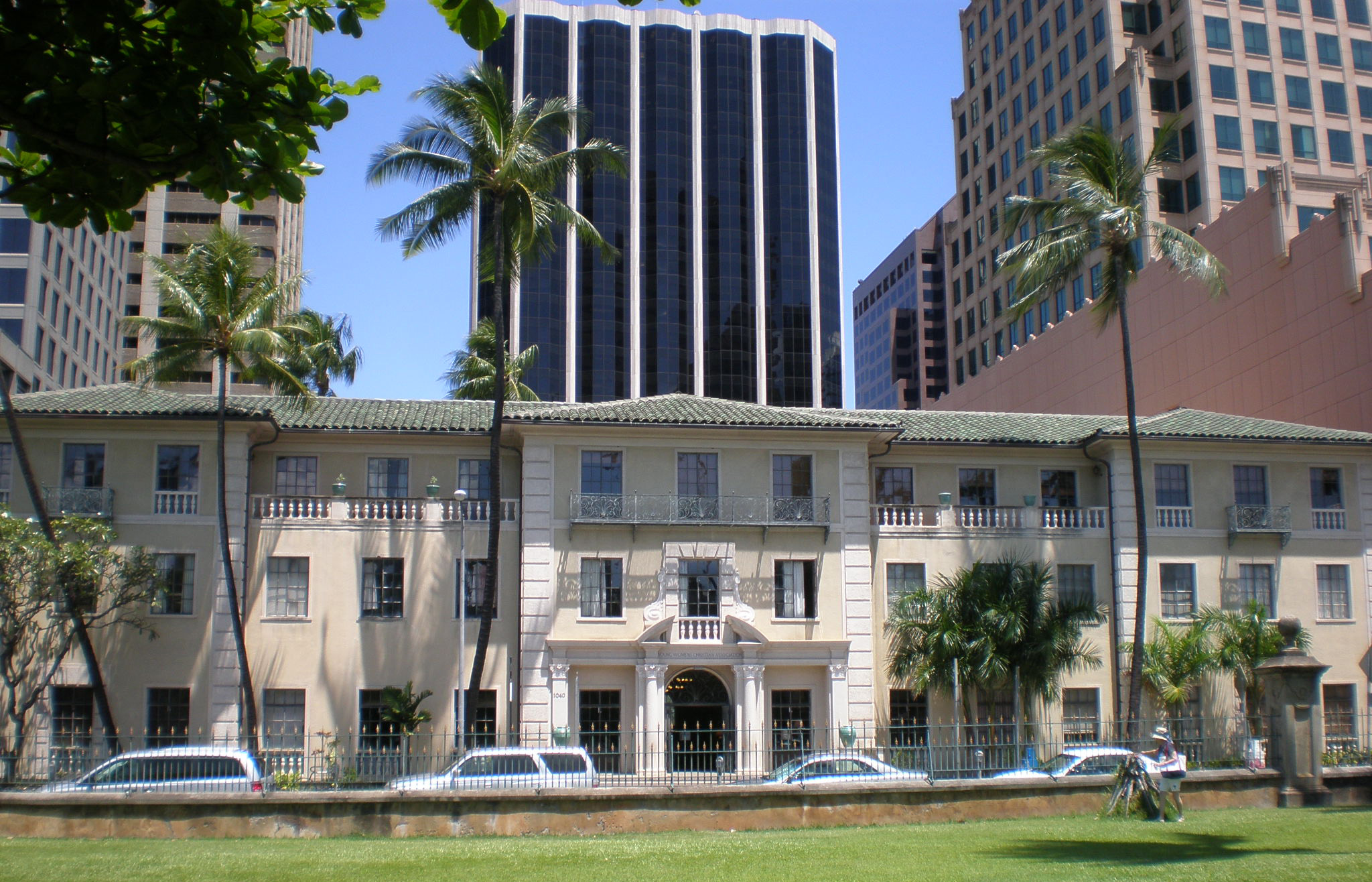
YWCA Building (Honolulu, Hawaii)

- YWCA Building (Honolulu, Hawaii), a building in Downtown Honolulu that was built in 1927. It was designed by Julia Morgan including Beaux-Arts and Mediterranean Revival stylings.
- YWCA Building (Peoria, Illinois), listed on the NRHP in Peoria County, Illinois
- Young Women's Christian Association (Elkhart, Indiana), listed on the NRHP in Elkhart County, Indiana
- YWCA (Evansville, Indiana), Vine Street, listed on the National Register of Historic Places in Vanderburgh County, Indiana
- YWCA (Muncie, Indiana), listed on the National Register of Historic Places in Delaware County, Indiana
- YWCA Blue Triangle Residence Hall, Indianapolis, Indiana, listed on the NRHP in Center Township, Marion County, Indiana
- Keokuk Young Women's Christian Association Building, Keokuk, Iowa, listed on the NRHP in Lee County, Iowa
- Ottumwa Young Women's Christian Association, Ottumwa, Iowa, listed on the NRHP in Wapello County, Iowa
- YWCA Boston building (Clarendon Street), Boston, Massachusetts, listed on the NRHP in Boston, Massachusetts. Landmark building of the YWCA Boston organization.
- YWCA of Duluth, Duluth, Minnesota, listed on the NRHP in St. Louis County, Minnesota.
- YWCA, Phillis Wheatley Branch, St. Louis, Missouri, listed on the NRHP in St. Louis, Missouri
- Young Women's Christian Association (Independent), Helena, Montana, listed on the NRHP in Lewis and Clark County, Montana
- Lincoln YWCA Building, Lincoln, Nebraska, listed on the NRHP in Lancaster County, Nebraska
- YWCA Building (Montclair, New Jersey), NRHP Listed in Essex County, New Jersey
- Young Women's Christian Association of Plainfield and North Plainfield, Plainfield, New Jersey, listed on the NRHP in Union County, New Jersey
- Young Women's Christian Association (Akron, Ohio), listed on the NRHP in Akron, Ohio
- Young Women's Christian Association of Cincinnati, listed on the NRHP in Cincinnati, Ohio
- Griswold Memorial Young Women's Christian Association, Columbus, Ohio, listed on the NRHP in Columbus, Ohio
- YWCA Youngstown, Youngstown, Ohio, listed on the NRHP in Mahoning County, Ohio
- Zanesville YWCA, Zanesville, Ohio, listed on the NRHP in Muskingum County, Ohio
- Kensington Branch of the Philadelphia YWCA, Philadelphia, Pennsylvania, listed on the NRHP in North Philadelphia, Pennsylvania
- Young Women's Christian Association Building (Nashville, Tennessee), listed on the NRHP in Davidson County, Tennessee
- Fort Worth Elks Lodge 124, Fort Worth, Texas, also known as YWCA of Fort Worth, NRHP-listed
- Young Women's Christian Association (Richmond, Virginia), listed on the NRHP in Richmond, Virginia
- YWCA Building (Bellingham, Washington), listed on the NRHP in Whatcom County, Washington
- YWCA Building (Seattle), Seattle, Washington, listed on the NRHP in King County, Washington
- YWCA Building (Yakima, Washington), Yakima, Washington listed on the NRHP in Yakima County, Washington
- Phillis Wheatley YWCA, Washington, D.C., listed on the NRHP in Northwest Quadrant, Washington, D.C.
- Lovejoy Manor, Janesville, Wisconsin, listed on the NRHP in Rock County, Wisconsin

=== Related places ===
Related places include:

- Barbizon Hotel for Women, New York City
- Young Men’s and Young Women’s Hebrew Association Building, Baltimore, Maryland

== See also ==
- YWCA USA
- List of YMCA buildings
- List of women's club buildings
