= Walter DeMordaunt =

American architect (c. 1895–1962)

Walter DeMordaunt (1894 – April 7, 1962), sometimes spelled Walter de Mordaunt, was an American architect who practiced in Pueblo, Colorado from 1920 to 1962. He was one of Colorado's most prolific architects. Several of his buildings are listed on the National Register of Historic Places.

== Early life ==
Demordaunt was born 1894 in Butte, Montana. He studied at the University of Utah. He then apprenticed in architecture in Butte.

== Career ==
In 1921, DeMordaunt moved to Pueblo, Colorado, where he was an associate with architect William H. Stickney. In 1926, he took over the architectural firm and became one of Colorado's most prolific architects. DeMordaunt worked in modern and revival styles. He also established his own "local sub-style of the Mediterranean Revival" that was used throughout Pueblo. He focused on the structure of buildings, allowing his staff of four to six people to add the style and decorative elements. Their work was primarily in Pueblo, but also in the Colorado cities of Cañon City, Grand Junction, Lamar, Las Animas, Meeker, and Salida.

One of his early projects was the Star-Journal Model Home, executed in English Country style. This design was supposed to showcase "modern living". The house is on the National Register of Historic Places. In 1929, he was selected to design the Chaffee County Courthouse in Salida, Colorado. His Art Deco style design called for stained glass windows for the records vaults; however, county officials bricked over the windows, citing securing concerns. Community vigilantes removed the bricks to expose the windows, only to have the county replace them. The courthouse open without the windows in 1932. It is listed on the Colorado State Register of Historic Properties.

In the Great Depression era, his firm worked on numerous New Deal-related and Public Works Administration projects, such as several adobe buildings for Pueblo Community College and two dining halls, eight dormitories, and thirty other buildings for the Colorado Mental Health Institute at Pueblo (aka Colorado State Hospital). Other projects in Colorado included a women's dormitory for the University of Colorado Boulder, the Bessemer School in Pueblo, the Carlile School in Pueblo, the central building of Pleasant View High School in Pueblo, the Lincoln School in La Junta, and schools in Buena Vista, Eads, Hooper, Meeker, Mosca, Ouray, Piñon, Ridgway, San Luis, and Sheridan Lake. He also designed additions to the Columbian School in Las Animas in 1936, Park School in Fowler, Avondale School in Avondale, Boone High School in Boone, and a gymnasium for Walsh High School in Walsh.

He also designed the Spanish Colonial style Lamar Post Office of Lamar, Colorado in 1936 as a Public Works Administration project. It is now on the National Register of Historic Places (NRHP). His Keating Junior High School nd the McClelland Orphanage in Pueblo are also listed on the National Register of Historic Places. He also designed The Nuart Theatre in Blackfoot, Idaho which is also on the NRHP. Another of his NRHP works is the Young Women's Christian Association in Pueblo. Built in 1936, this building is in Mediterranean Revival style with thick masonry walls, an arcaded walkway, bracketed eaves, a third-story loggia, a corner tower, and clay roof tiles.

DeMourdant was president of the American Institute of Architects from 1955 to 1956.

== Personal life ==
DeMourdant was married to Fredella DeMourdant. They had two children: Walter J. DeMourdant and Pauline Sells. Around 1940, DeMourdant purchased a house at 1827 North Grand Avenue in Pueblo, formerly the home of banker Jonathan Burwell Kilbourn and state senator and U.S. Marshall Samuel J. Burris. He lived here until he died.

DeMourdant died in Pueblo on April 7, 1962, at the age of 67. He was buried in Pueblo at the Roselawn Cemetery.

== Projects ==
Following are some of DeMourdant's most notable projects.

Building	Location	Date	Status	Notes	References
Star-Journal Model Home	2920 High Street, Pueblo, Colorado	1927	NRHP		
Pleasant View High School	Pueblo, Colorado				
Bessemer School	Pueblo, Colorado				
Maxwell Hospital	Lamar, Colorado				
Colorado State Fair Exposition Building	Pueblo, Colorado	1928	Colorado State Register of Historic Properties		
First Presbyterian Church	Las Animas, Colorado				
Whitman Hotel	Pueblo, Colorado				
Keating Junior High School, east and west wings	Pueblo, Colorado	1929	NRHP, Colorado State Register of Historic Properties	William W. Stickney designed the central part in 1922	
Nuart Theatre	195 N. Broadway, Blackfoot, Idaho	1929	NRHP	designed for his brother	
Railway Savings Building	119 W. Fifth Street, Pueblo, Colorado	1928	Extant		
Sheridan Lake School	Sheridan Lake, Colorado	1929	Extant		
Colorado State Fair Grandstands	Pueblo, Colorado	1930			
Walsh School Gymnasium	Walsh, Colorado	1930			
Baxter School	Pueblo, Colorado	1930			
Carlile School	Pueblo, Colorado	1930s			
Colorado Mental Health Institute at Pueblo, 40 buildings	Pueblo, Colorado			including 8 dormitories and 2 dining halls	
University of Colorado Boulder women's dormitory	Boulder, Colorado				
Chaffee County Courthouse	104 Crestone Avenue, Salida, Colorado	1932	Colorado State Register of Historic Properties		
Mosca School	Mosca, Colorado	1932			
Young Women's Christian Association Building	801 North Santa Fe Avenue, Pueblo, Colorado	1935	NRHP		
McClelland Orphanage	415 East Abriendo Avenue, Pueblo, Colorado	1935	NRHP		
Buena Vista School	Buena Vista, Colorado	1935			
Columbian School addition	1026 West Sixth Street, Las Animas, Colorado	1936	NRHP		
Lamar Post Office	300 South Fifth Street, Lamar, Colorado	1936	NRHP	under the supervision of Louis A. Simon	
Boyd School	Alamosa, Colorado	1936			
Maxwell Hotel	Lamar, Colorado	1936			
Lutheran Hospital	Alamosa, Colorado	1936			
Lincoln School	300 North Third Street, La Junta, Colorado	1937	NRHP	with John Gray	
Ouray High School	Ouray, Colorado	1937			
Pueblo Junior College (now Pueblo Community College)	900 West Orman Avenue, Pueblo, Colorado	1937		with John Gray	
Ridgway High School	Ridgeway, Colorado	1937			
San Luis School	San Luis, Colorado	1937			
Central School	Alamosa, Colorado	1937			
Eads School	Eads, Colorado	1938			
Holy Trinity School	Trinidad, Colorado	1944			
Rice Junior High School	Trinidad, Colorado	1948			
Avondale School	Avondale, Colorado				
Boone High School	Boone, Colorado				
Park School	Fowler, Colorado				
Pueblo Drive-In screen tower and concession stand	1224 US 50, Pueblo, Colorado	1949	Extant		
Scottish Rite Temple (now Parkview Medical Center West Annex)	1518 North Elizabeth Street, Pueblo, Colorado	1950–1955	Extant		
