= YWCA Building (Bellingham, Washington) =

Local YWCA in a historic building

- Young Women's Christian Association
- U.S. National Register of Historic Places
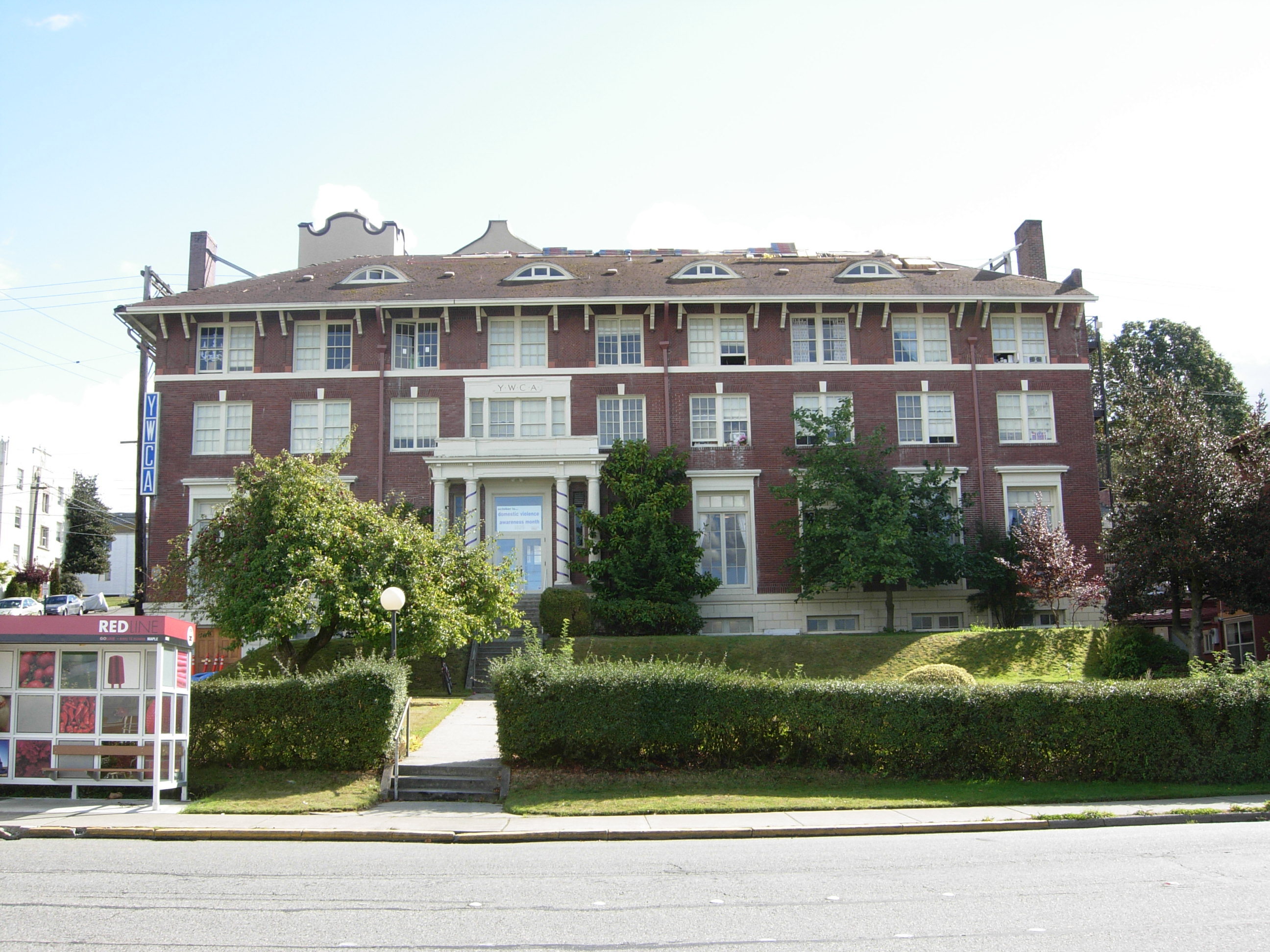
- The roof contains four eyebrow dormers.

- Location within Washington (state)
- Location: 1026 North Forest Street, Bellingham, Washington 98225
- Coordinates: 48°44′43″N 122°28′44″W
- Built: 1915
- Architect: Carl Frelinghuysen Gould
- Architectural style: Colonial Revival, Eclectic
- NRHP reference No.: 77001367
- Added to NRHP: April 21, 1977

The YWCA Building is a historic Young Women's Christian Association building Bellingham, Washington that was completed in 1915. It was added to the National Register of Historic Places in 1977 and continues to be used by the Bellingham YWCA.

== History ==
In 1899, the first YWCA presence in Bellingham formed as a club at the New Whatcom Normal School, what is now Western Washington University. A formal chapter was formed in 1907 which focused on helping women from overseas and rural areas find employment at a time when many new arrivals were tricked or coerced into prostitution. Charles X. and Frances Larrabee donated the land and underwrote construction of the building which was finished in 1915.

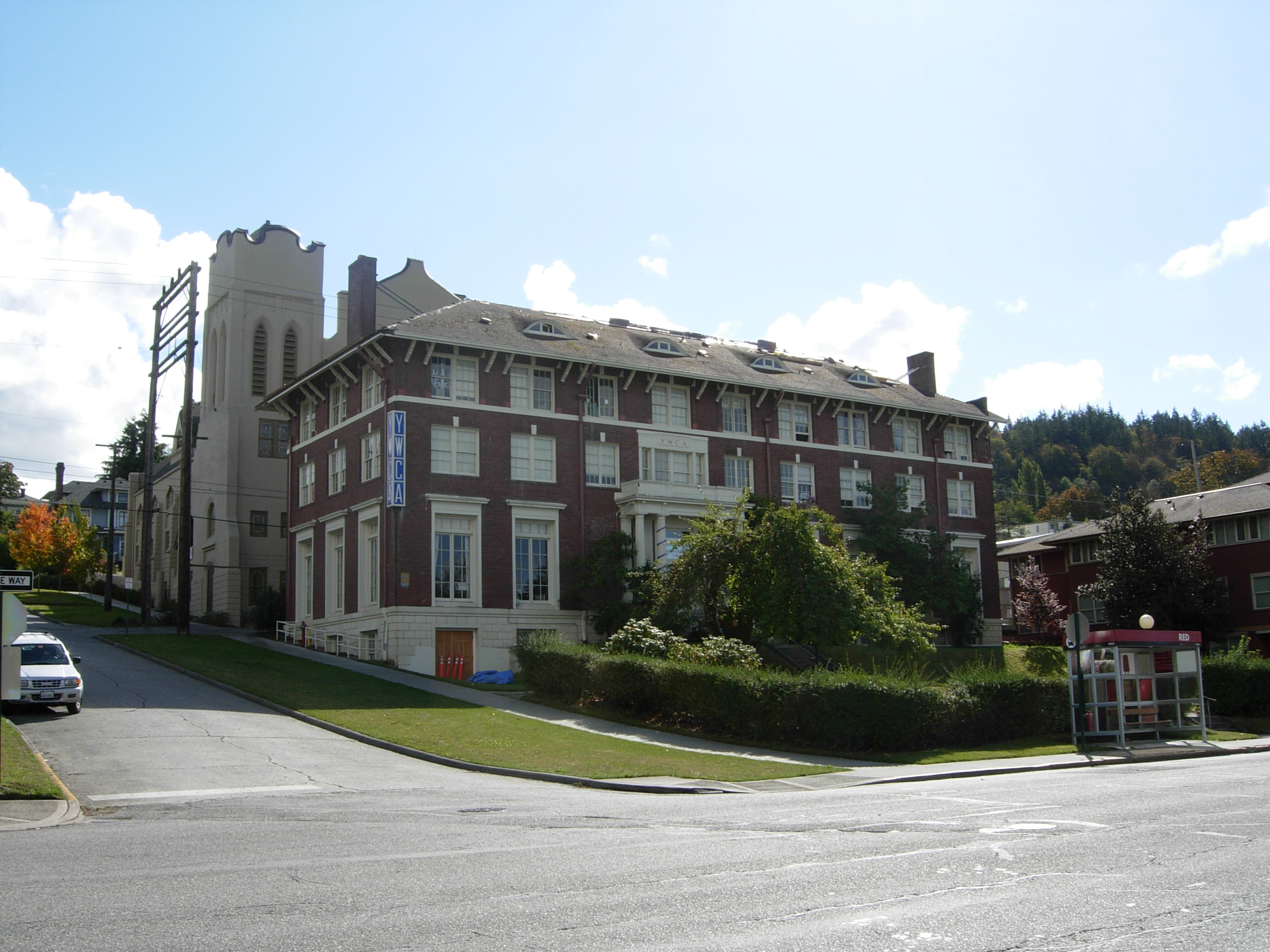
The clubhouse in front of First Presbyterian Church

Today, the organization provides low cost apartments with a shared kitchen, bathroom and laundry in conjunction with support programs to help women. There is a retail Y's Buys thrift shop at 1224 North State St, Bellingham, WA. The organization also runs a "low barrier" emergency shelter next door at the First Presbyterian Church where clients are not required to participate in their programs.

== Architecture ==
Seattle architect Carl Frelinghuysen Gould was hired to design the three-and-a-half-story palazzo overlooking Bellingham Bay. The structure is usually described as Colonial Revival, but is eclectic with elements of Georgian Revival, Queen Anne, and Italian Renaissance Revival architecture. The entrance has a portico with Doric columns and the roof has eyebrow dormers. The brick is in a Flemish bond pattern except for the friezes above the entrance which use herringbone bond.

== See also ==
- List of YWCA buildings
- YWCA Building (Seattle)
- YWCA Building (Yakima, Washington)
- National Register of Historic Places listings in Whatcom County, Washington
