= Camp Fremont =

US military base in Menlo Park, California (1917–1919)

Coordinates: 37°26′56″N 122°11′11″W

Camp Fremont was a World War I-era military base located in Menlo Park near Palo Alto, California. Construction started in July 1917 and the post closed in September, 1919. The post was named for John C. Frémont, a US Army officer and government official who was prominent in California during the 1850s.

== Creation of post ==
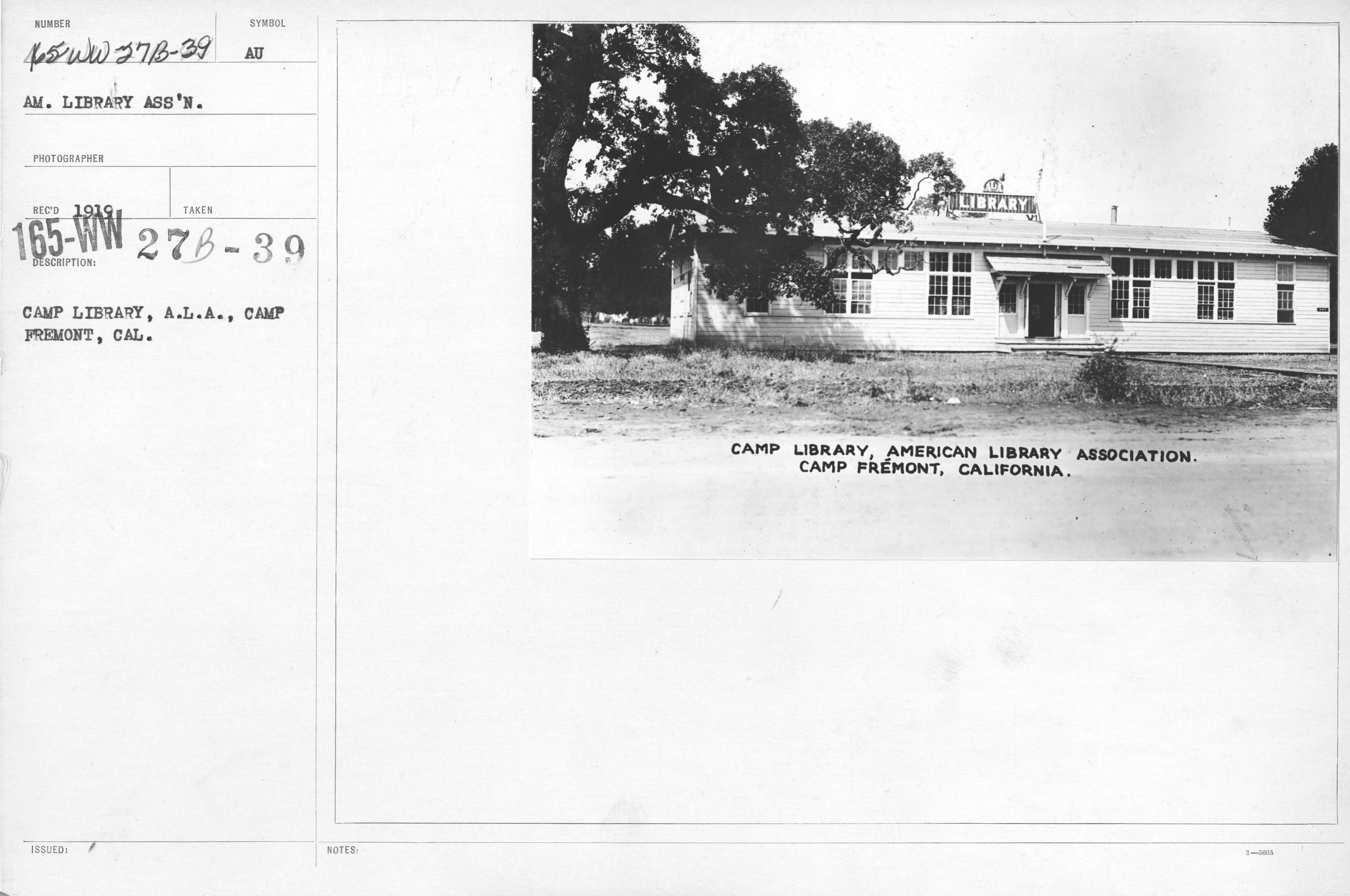
Camp Library at Camp Fremont (c. 1917)

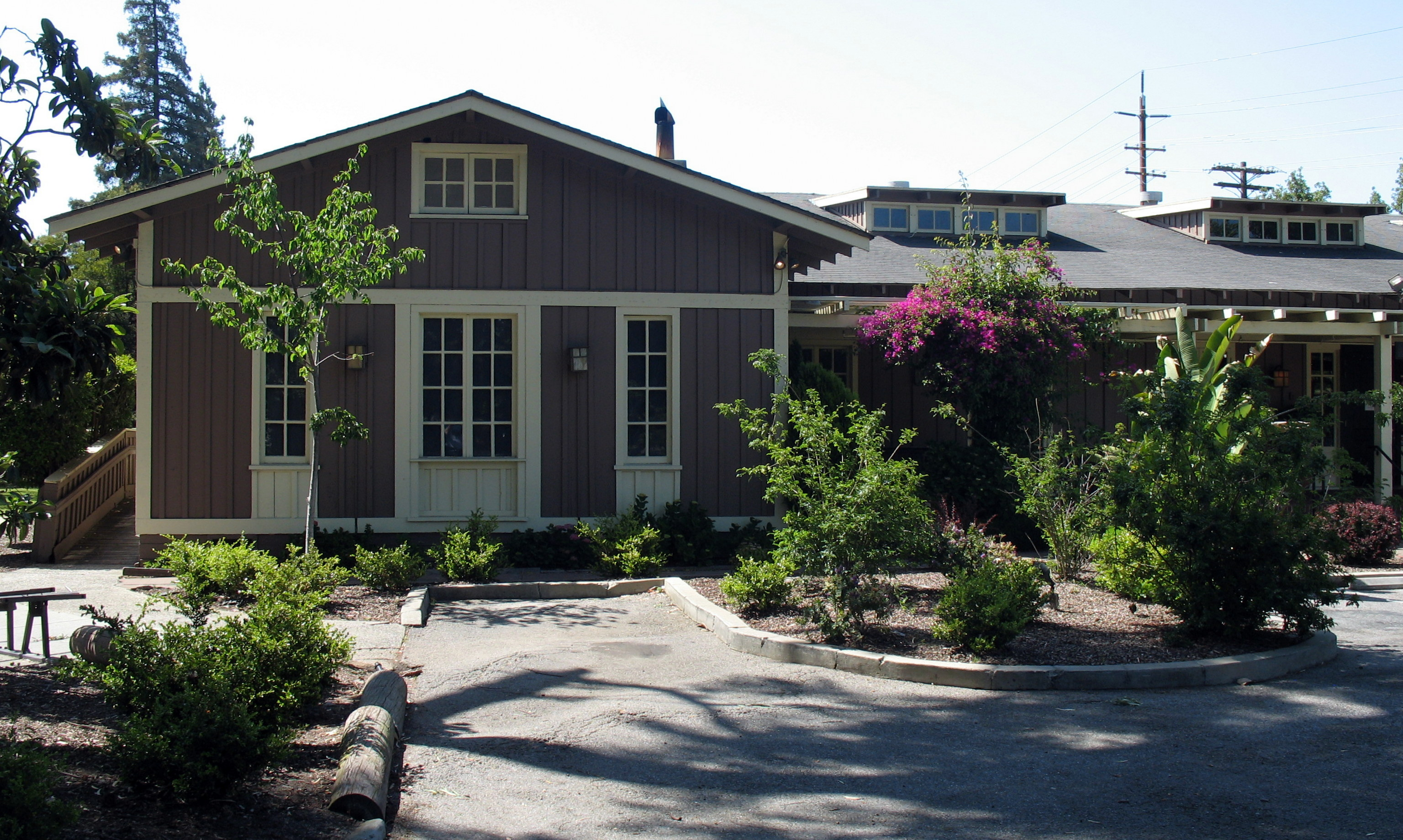
MacArthur Park Restaurant – a former YWCA "Hostess House" designed by Julia Morgan in 1918

Camp Fremont was constructed on vacant land in and around the area of Palo Alto and Menlo Park. Camp Fremont consisted of slightly more than 7,200 acres (29 km^{2}) and contained approximately 1,125 structures, mostly temporary buildings constructed of wood. During preparation for possible entry into World War I, the U.S. Army determined a need existed for a post on the west coast of the United States to train National Guard units for combat.

Construction started on July 24, 1917, and the new installation was named in honor of Major General John C. Fremont, an early hero of California.

== World War I ==
Camp Fremont served as a training site for the National Guard's 41st Infantry Division, which included soldiers from Washington, Oregon, Idaho, and Wyoming. The 41st Division was later moved to Camp Greene, where it completed its training before departing for fighting in France.

In August, 1918, Camp Fremont was home to the 12th Infantry. In the autumn of 1918, the flu pandemic hit Camp Fremont and killed 147.

The 8th Infantry Division then occupied Camp Fremont. Slated for combat in France, the 8th Division was later assigned the mission of fighting in Russia during the Siberian Intervention.

Camp Fremont was also home to the 332nd Auxiliary Remount Depot, part of the U.S. Army Veterinary Corps. The depot was authorized 5,000 animals, and averaged about 2,300. Remount depots were organized to procure, train and condition horses and mules, and then dispatch them to the units that required them.

== Association with prominent individuals ==
- General John K. Cannon completed his initial military training at Camp Fremont.
- Major General William S. Graves assumed command of the 8th Infantry Division at Camp Fremont in 1918.
- Warren Grimm, All-American football player and Army officer, completed his training at Camp Fremont before taking part in the Siberian Intervention.
- Philip Johnston, one of the organizers of the World War II Navajo code talkers, was a World War I veteran who had trained at Camp Fremont.
- Brigadier General Alfred A. Starbird, commanded the 8th Field Artillery Brigade during World War I
- Brigadier General James Edward Wharton was stationed at Camp Fremont at the start of his career during World War I.
- Lieutenant General Laurin L. Williams served at Camp Fremont as a second lieutenant.

== Post closing and legacy ==
After the end of World War I combat, there was no longer a use for Camp Fremont, and the Army ordered the post closed. The base hospital was acquired by the Public Health Service from the War Department and opened as "United States Public Health Service Hospital No. 24" on April 2, 1919. The 90 acre facility was operated as a tuberculosis sanitorium, with a capacity of 570 beds. The remaining buildings were sold at auction, and the camp was abandoned in January 1920.

Several new businesses were begun in Menlo Park and Palo Alto to provide goods and services to soldiers at Camp Fremont, many of which stayed in existence after the post closed. Menlo Park received its first paved streets and its first municipal water and gas services during World War I, both of which were constructed by the 8th Division engineers.

== Present day ==
The post hospital on Willow Road in Menlo Park later became the site of a Veterans Administration hospital. It is now also the location of Stanford University's Arbor Free Clinic.

Two popular restaurants, MacArthur Park (which once housed Palo Alto's community center) and the Oasis Beer Garden (now closed) are both located in former Camp Fremont buildings.

Fremont Park, in downtown Menlo Park, has a plaque commemorating Camp Fremont.

== In popular culture ==
Camp Fremont gained a new degree of fame when it was referenced as the military base to which Master Sergeant Ernie Bilko was assigned (played by Phil Silvers) in the 1950s television sitcom The Phil Silvers Show.
