= Hostess House =

Historic house in California, United States

- U.S. National Register of Historic Places
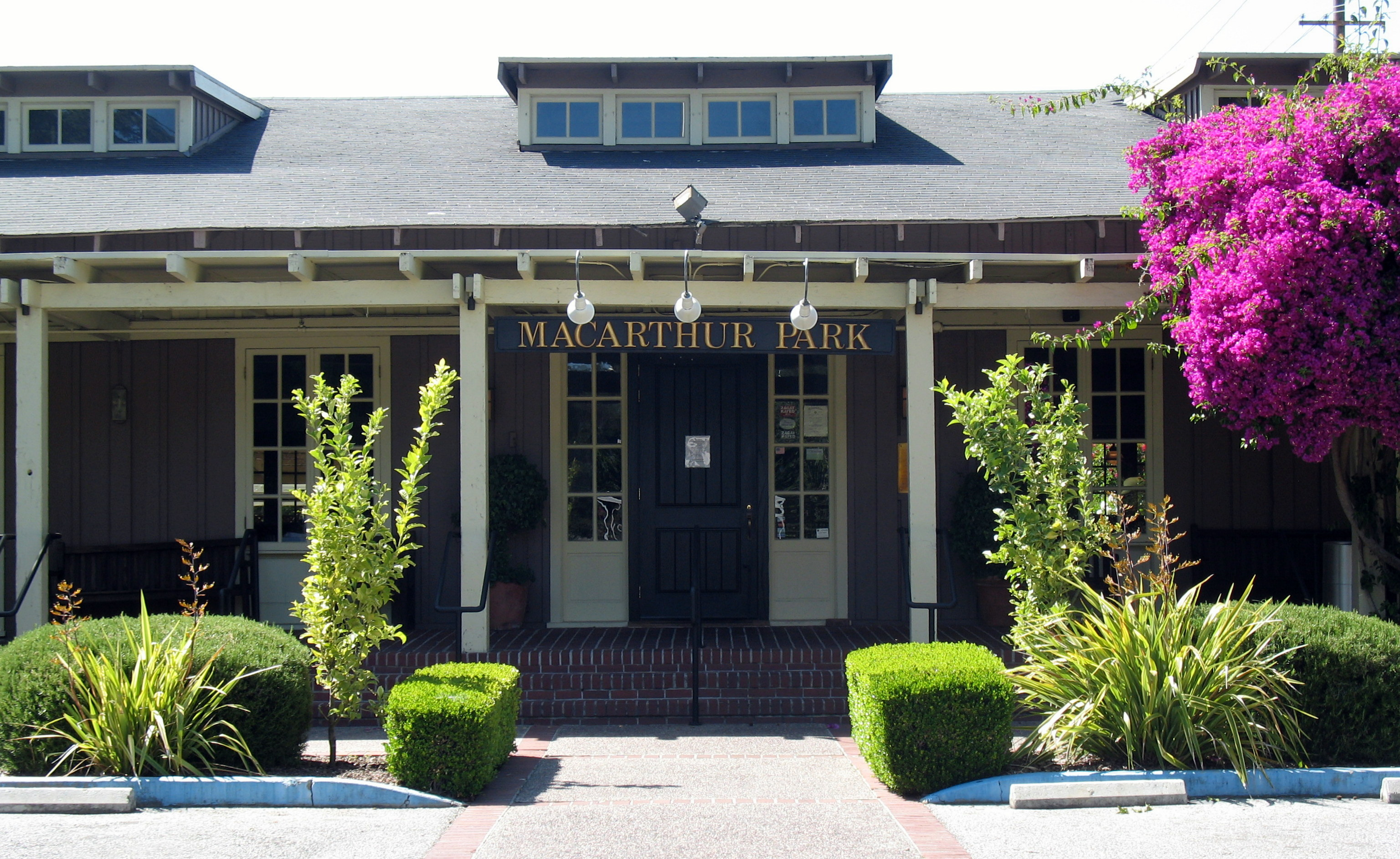
- The house in 2012

- Location within California
- Location: W of University Avenue underpass of El Camino Real, Palo Alto, California
- Coordinates: 37°26′35″N 122°09′56″W
- Area: 9.5 acres (3.8 ha)
- Built: 1918
- Architect: Julia Morgan
- Architectural style: Bay Region Traditional
- NRHP reference No.: 76000528
- Added to NRHP: July 30, 1976

The Hostess House is a historic house in Palo Alto, California. It was built in 1918 by the YWCA for members of the United States Army to meet their relatives while they were still serving in World War I. The Hostess House was originally located in Camp Fremont.

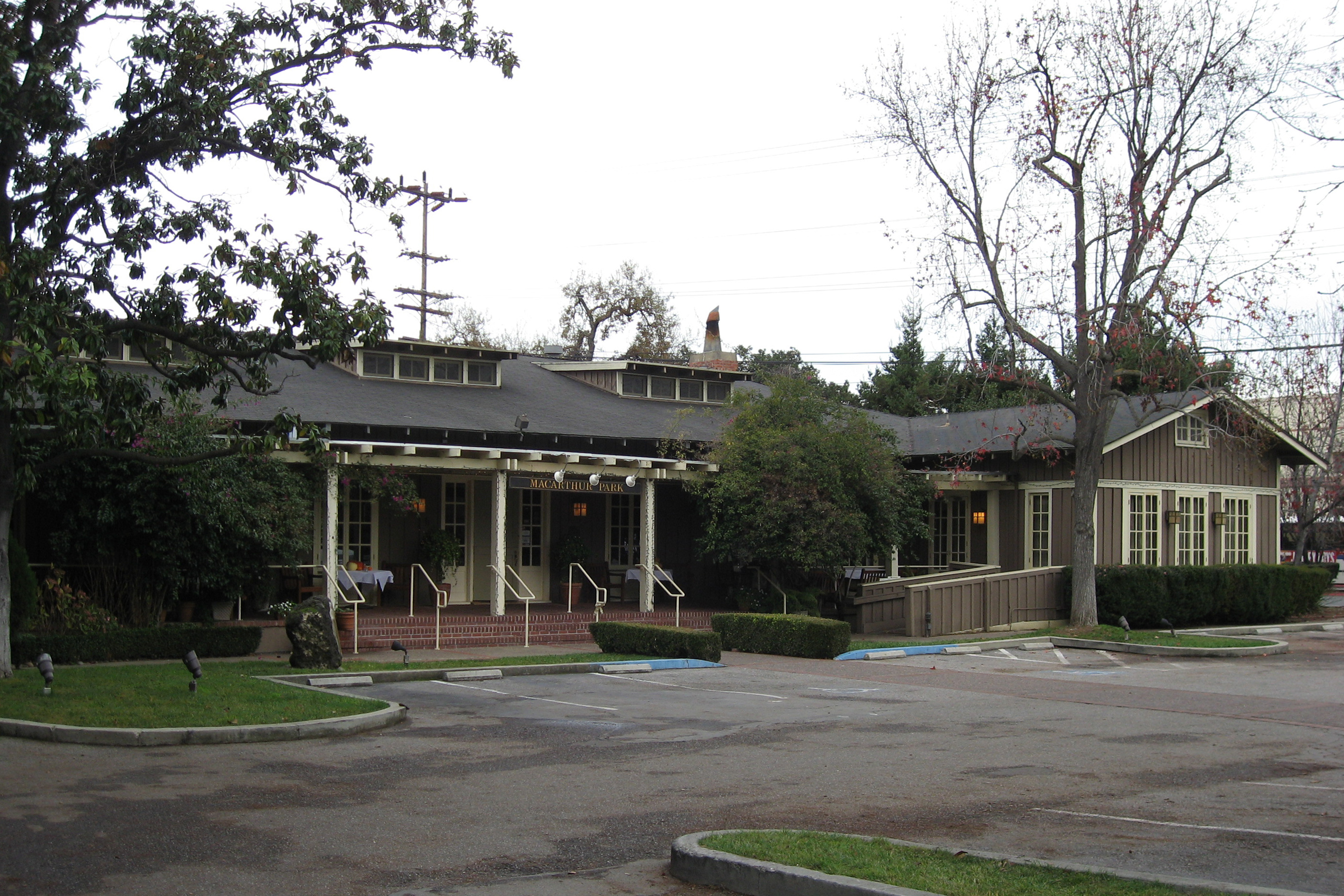

The building operated as a hostess house from May through October 1918. The house was designed by architect Julia Morgan. It has been listed on the National Register of Historic Places since July 30, 1976. The building moved locations after World War I ended and was repurposed into a municipally sponsored community center, the first in the nation. It is now the MacArthur Park Restaurant.

== Landmark status ==
The registration for the site of Hostess House home as a historic resource dates back to April 2, 1976. A commemorative plaque that designates this site as California Historical Landmark 895 plaque commemorating the Hostess House at 27 University Avenue, Palo Alto, California. The plaque was placed by the California State Parks in cooperation with the city of Palo Alto, on November 11, 1976.

The inscription on the marker reads:

"This building originally served Camp Fremont as a meeting place for servicemen and visitors. When moved from its original site to Palo Alto, it became the first municipally sponsored community center in the nation. It is the only remaining structure from California’s World War I Army training camps. Designed by Julia Morgan in 1918 for the YMCA, it was dedicated one year later to those who died in this war."

== See also ==
- List of YWCA buildings
- List of works by Julia Morgan
- National Register of Historic Places listings in Santa Clara County, California
