= Young Women's Christian Association (Pueblo, Colorado) =

- U.S. National Register of Historic Places
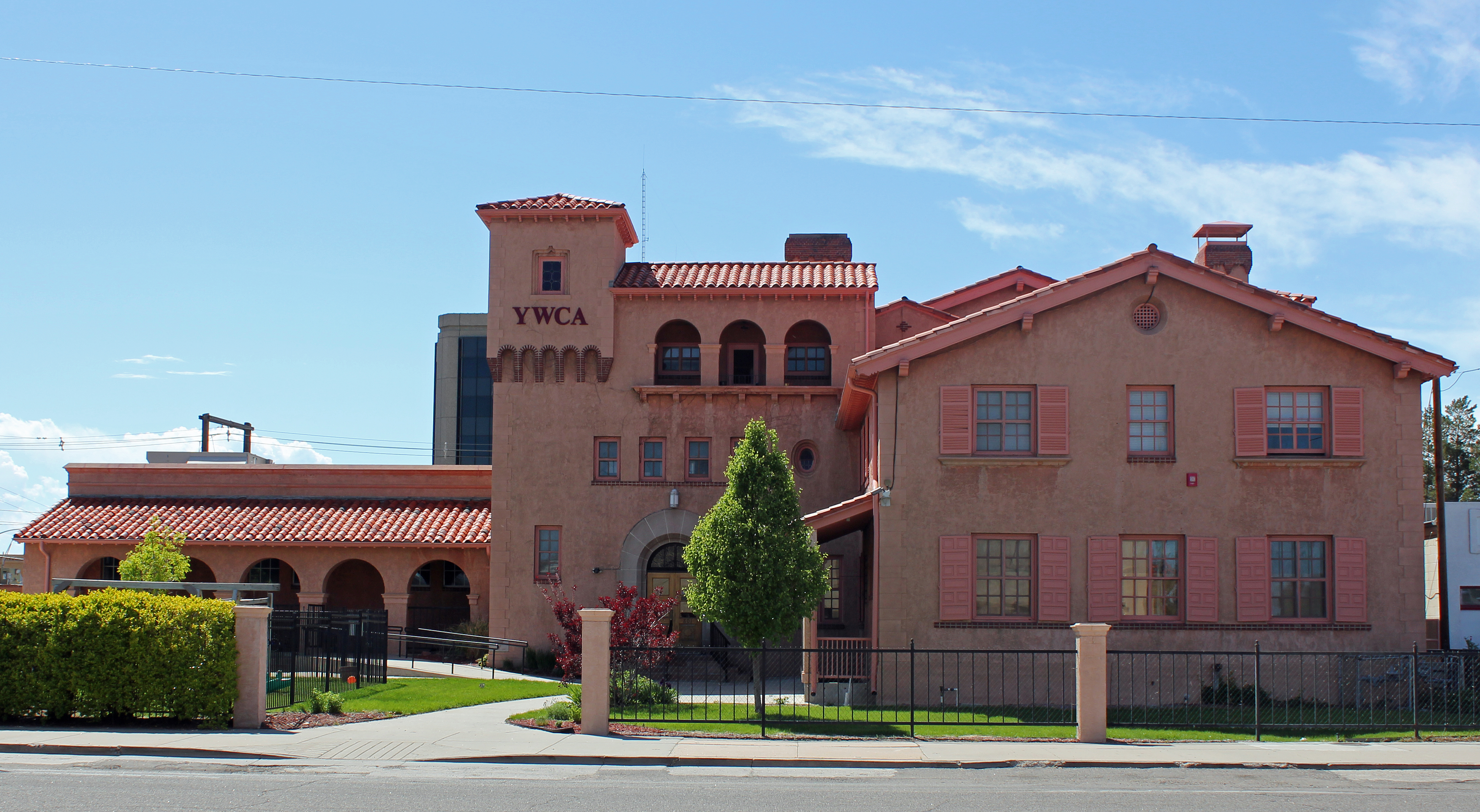

- Location within Colorado Location within the United States
- Location: 801 N. Santa Fe Ave., Pueblo, Colorado
- Coordinates: 38°16′28″N 104°36′24″W
- Area: 0.5 acres (0.20 ha)
- Built: 1934
- Architect: DeMourdant, Walter
- NRHP reference No.: 80000921
- Added to NRHP: March 24, 1980

The Young Women's Christian Association in Pueblo, Colorado is a historic YWCA building which was built in 1934. It was listed on the National Register of Historic Places in 1980.

It is an L-shaped building designed by architect Walter DeMordaunt.

== See also ==
- List of YWCA buildings
- National Register of Historic Places listings in Pueblo County, Colorado
