= YWCA Youngstown =

- YWCA Building
- U.S. National Register of Historic Places
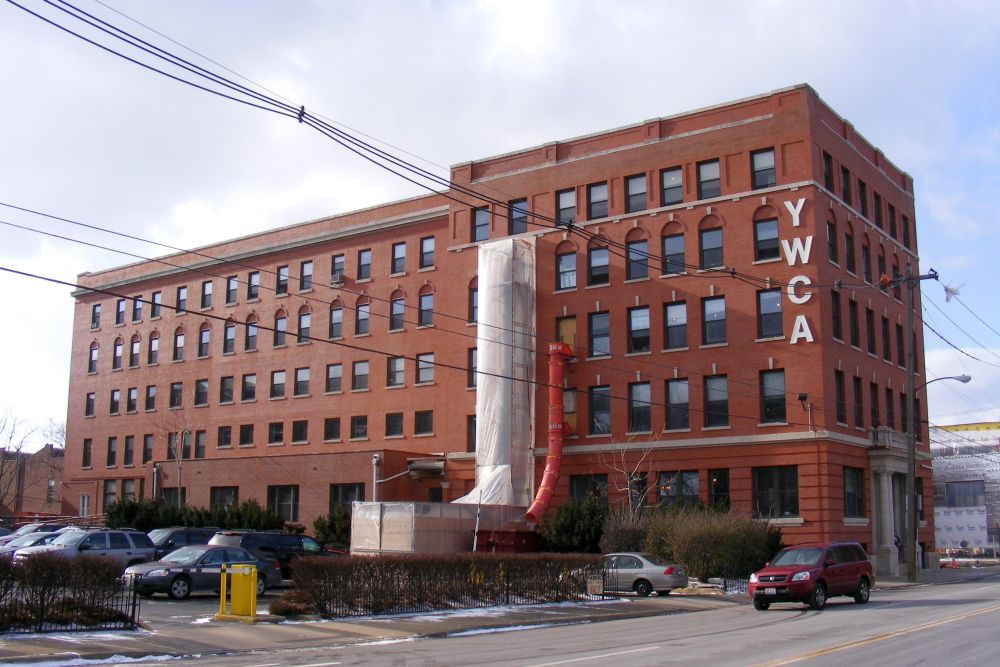
- YWCA in 2008

- Location within Ohio Location within the United States
- Location: 25 W. Rayen Ave., Youngstown, Ohio
- Coordinates: 41°6′13″N 80°38′55″W
- Area: less than one acre
- Built: 1911
- Architect: Angus Wade
- Architectural style: Classical Revival
- MPS: Downtown Youngstown MRA
- NRHP reference No.: 86001949
- Added to NRHP: July 23, 1986

The YWCA Building, located at 25 West Rayen Avenue in Youngstown, Ohio, is an historic building built in 1911 for members of the Young Women's Christian Association. On July 23, 1986, it was added to the National Register of Historic Places. YWCA Mahoning Valley, formerly known as YWCA Youngstown, occupies the building. YWCA Youngstown merged with YWCA Warren on May 1, 2018, to become YWCA Mahoning Valley. YWCA Mahoning Valley also operates a site at 375 North Park Avenue in Warren, Ohio, as well as scattered-site housing in the greater Youngstown area.

== National Register listing ==
- YWCA Building ** (added 1986 - Building - #86001949)

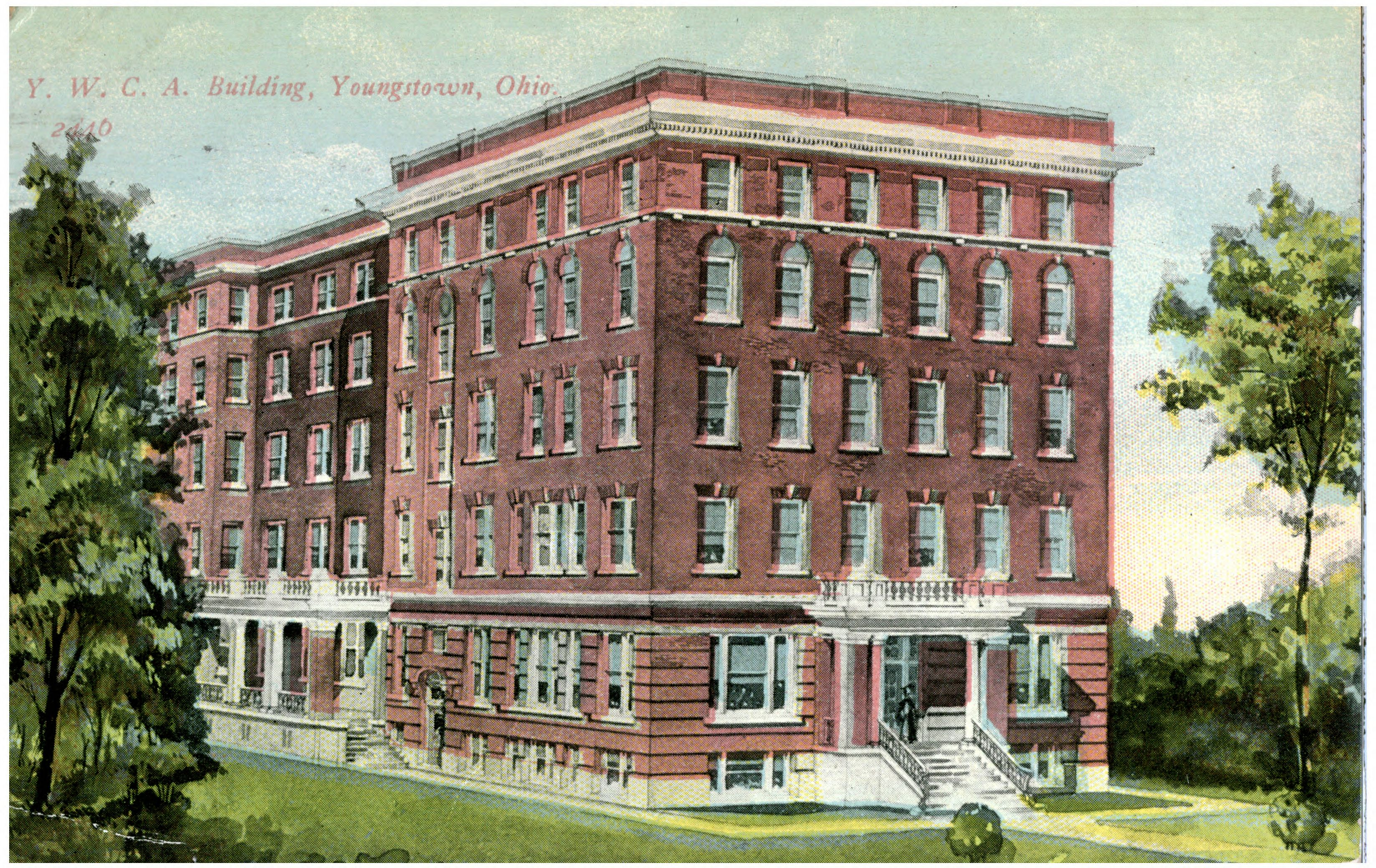
Postcard of the building

- 25 W. Rayen Ave., Youngstown
- Historic Significance: Event, Architecture/Engineering
- Architect, builder, or engineer: Wade, Angus
- Architectural Style: Classical Revival
- Area of Significance: Architecture, Social History
- Period of Significance: 1900-1924
- Owner: Private
- Historic Function: Social
- Historic Sub-function: Civic
- Current Function: Social
- Current Sub-function: Civic

== History and current use ==
The building was built in 1911 for members of the YWCA. Like many YWCAs of the time, the Youngstown YWCA provided rooms for single women to rent in addition to providing recreational and social activities. YWCA Mahoning Valley is still actively using this building as its headquarters and administrative offices. Housing is now provided for homeless families as well as homeless women. In 2009 and 2010, YWCA Youngstown (as it was known at the time) received grant money to convert its 36 existing single room units in this building into 30 self-contained efficiency and one-bedroom units.

== See also ==
- List of YWCA buildings
- National Register of Historic Places listings in Ohio
