= Astria Regional Medical Center =

Coordinates: 46.5970749°N 120.5208049°W

- Atria Health

Geography
- Location: Yakima, Washington, United States

Organization
- Type: Community

Services
- Emergency department: Level III trauma center
- Beds: 150

Links
- Website: www.astria.health/locations/astria-regional-medical-center/
- Lists: Hospitals in Washington state

Astria Regional Medical Center was a 150-bed hospital located in Yakima, Washington.

This hospital was a Level III adult trauma center.

Astria Regional Medical Center closed January 13, 2020.

== History ==
On August 2, 1891, the Sisters of Charity of Providence agreed to take care of sick government workers and the residents of Yakima, thus creating Yakima's first and only hospital, a distinction that was held for more than 59 years.

The first hospital was a 7-room house on the corner of Yakima and Naches Avenues. The hospital cared for 37 patients the first year, and within a year the hospital moved to a larger building to keep up with demand.

St. Elizabeth's grew from performing their first surgery on a kitchen table in the 1890s to opening the first coronary care unit in the state in the 1960s and the region's first comprehensive inpatient rehabilitation facility in the 1980s. In 1994, St. Elizabeth Medical Center became Providence Yakima Medical Center, and in 2003 the name was changed to Yakima Regional Medical and Cardiac Center. In 2017, the hospital joined a healthcare system called Astria Health and was renamed Astria Regional Medical Center. The cardiac services were expanded and within the hospital, the expert cardiology staff, state of the art facilities and cardiac programs were renamed Astria Heart Institute.

Accredited by the Joint Commission.

Astria Health, which runs hospitals in Yakima, Toppenish and Sunnyside and a family of clinics throughout the Yakima Valley, filed for Chapter 11 bankruptcy protection in May, 2019.

Astria Regional Medical Center closed January 13, 2019.

== COVID-19 ==
The state of Washington entered into an agreement to lease Astria Regional Medical Center as a temporary field hospital to support the state of Washington during the COVID-19 epidemic. The state is planning to lease the building through September 30, 2020 and will pay $1.5 Million for the lease. The medical center is planning on being staffed by 80 staff from the U.S. Public Health Service Commissioned Corps. It is unknown when the building will be ready to receive patients if it is needed.

== Redevelopment ==
In 2023, the Yakima YWCA obtained the St. Elizabeth's School of Nursing building in the complex, and began converting it into a women's shelter.
