= YWCA Building (Seattle) =

Building in Seattle, Washington, U.S.

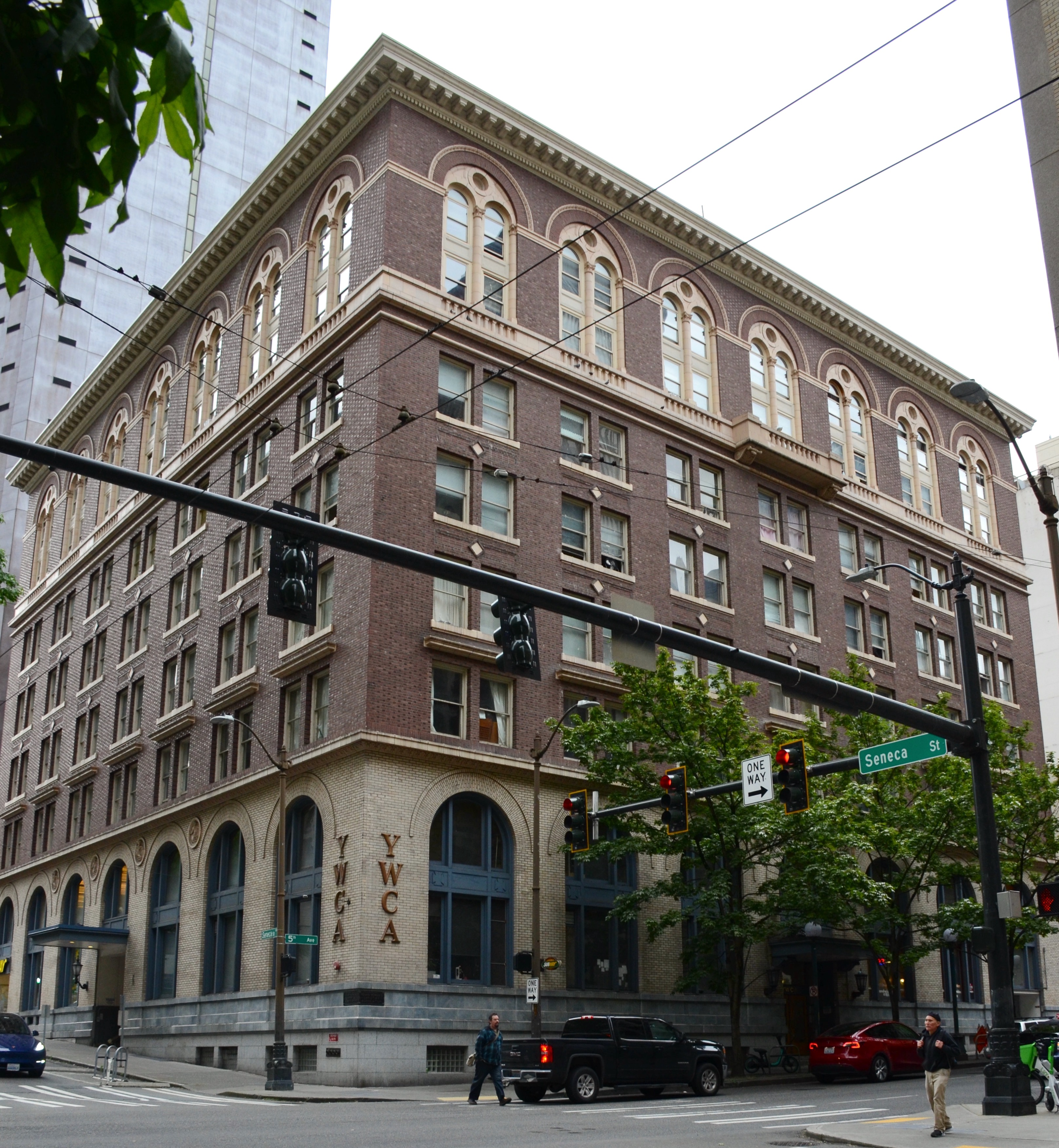
- The building's exterior in 2022
- Interactive map of the YWCA Building area

General information
- Location: Seattle, Washington, United States
- Coordinates: 47°36′28.5″N 122°19′58″W

Design and construction
- Architect: Édouard Frère Champney

Built in 1914, the YWCA Building is a historic building in Seattle, in the U.S. state of Washington. The structure is listed on the National Register of Historic Places and has been designated a Seattle landmark.

== Gallery ==
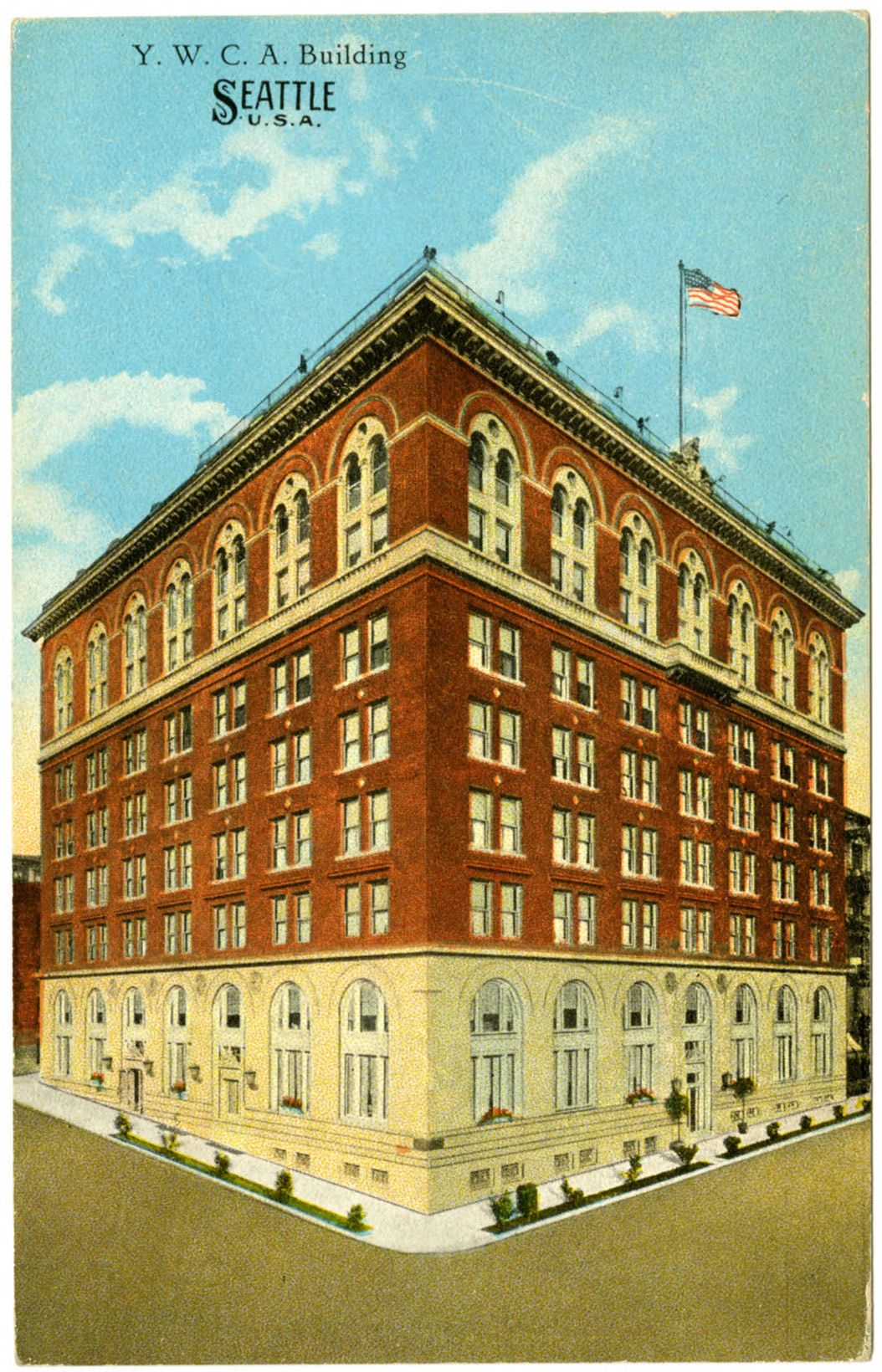
Postcard of exterior (c. 1915)

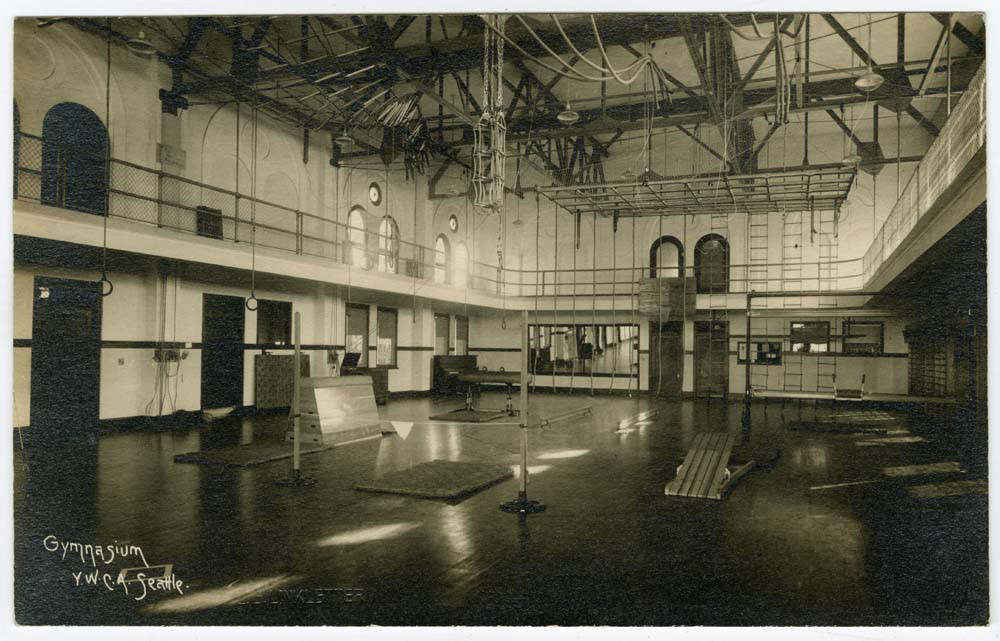
Gymnasium with running track above (c. 1914)

== See also ==
- List of Seattle landmarks
- List of YWCA buildings
- National Register of Historic Places listings in Seattle
- YWCA Building (Bellingham, Washington)
- YWCA Building (Yakima, Washington)
