= Lincoln YWCA Building =

- U.S. National Register of Historic Places
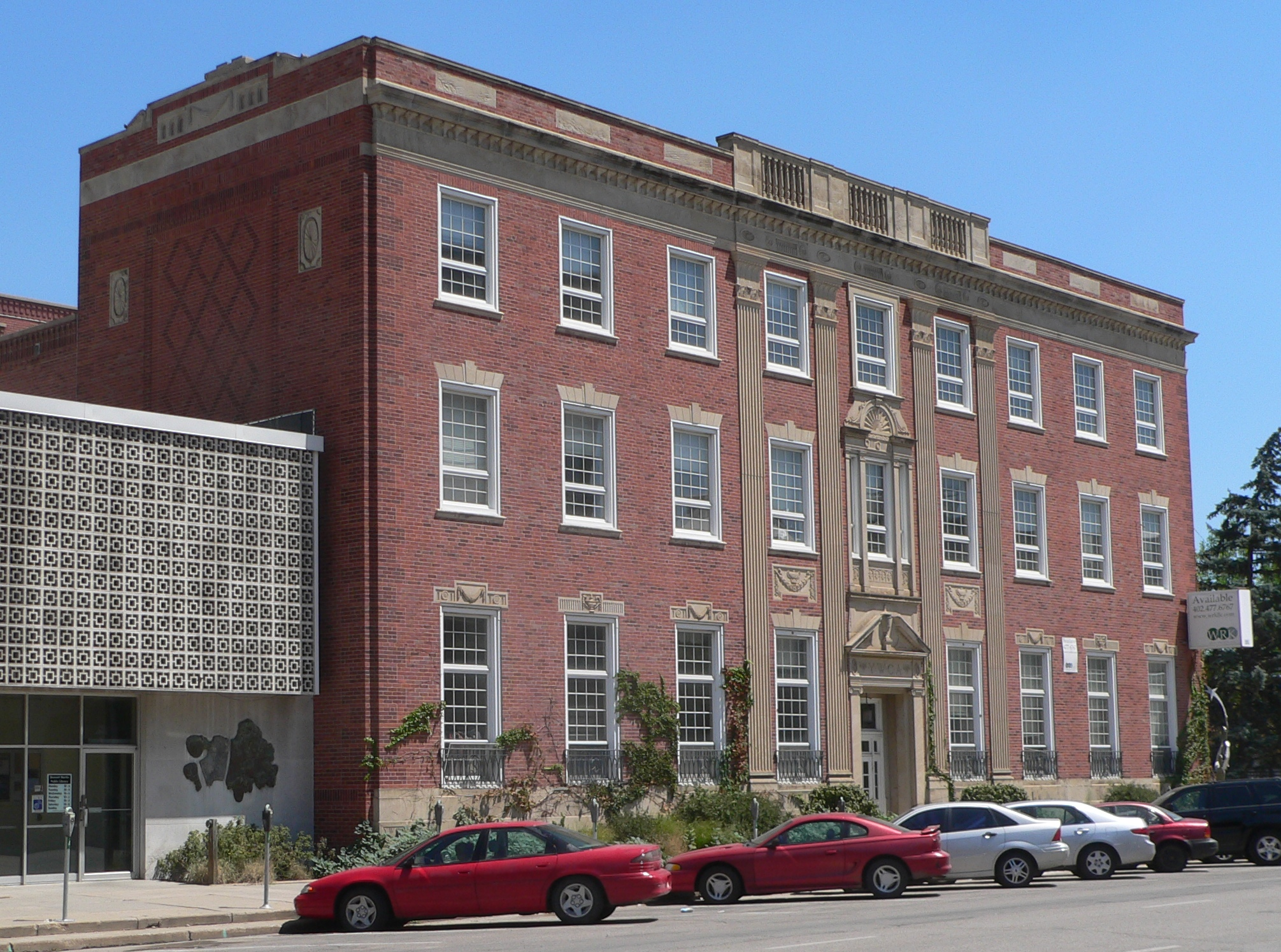
- The building in 2012

- Location within Nebraska Location within the United States
- Location: 1432 N Street, Lincoln, Nebraska
- Coordinates: 40°48′46″N 96°41′55″W
- Area: less than one acre
- Built: 1932
- Architect: Meginnis & Schaumberg
- Architectural style: Georgian Revival
- NRHP reference No.: 84002490
- Added to NRHP: June 21, 1984

The Lincoln YWCA Building is a historic three-story building in Lincoln, Nebraska. It was built in 1932 for the Young Women's Christian Association (YWCA), and designed in the Georgian Revival style by architects Meginnis & Schaumberg, with an "entrance frontispiece, fluted pilasters, window lintels, inset panels, and blind balustrades;-darker brickwork simulating quoins at corners and diaperwork on side walls." It has been listed on the National Register of Historic Places since June 21, 1984.

== See also ==
- List of YWCA buildings
- National Register of Historic Places listings in Lancaster County, Nebraska
