= Laurin Lyman Williams =

United States Army general

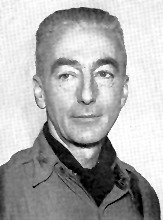
- Williams as a colonel commanding the 405th Infantry Regiment
- Born: 3 October 1895; Spokane, Washington
- Died: 10 September 1975 (aged 79); San Diego, California
- Military career
- Allegiance: United States
- Branch: United States Army
- Service years: 1917–1957
- Rank: Lieutenant General
- Commands: 405th Infantry Regiment
- Conflicts: World War II; Korean War
- Awards: Distinguished Service Medal; Silver Star; Legion of Merit; Bronze Star; Purple Heart

Laurin Lyman Williams (3 October 1895 – 10 September 1975) was a lieutenant general in the United States Army. He was the Comptroller of the Army in the late 1950s.

== Early life ==
Williams was born on 3 October 1895, in Spokane, Washington. He graduated from Yale University in 1917 and received a commission as a second lieutenant of infantry through the Reserve Officer Training Corps.

== Early military career ==
As a junior officer, Williams served at posts throughout the United States, including Camp Fremont, California and Camp Lee, Virginia. In 1921, he graduated from the Infantry School Basic Course.

In the mid-1920s, Williams served in China with the 15th Infantry Regiment. He also served as an ROTC instructor at the University of Washington.

Williams graduated from the Tank School Regular Course in 1930. In 1935, he was assigned to Plattsburgh Barracks, New York. In 1939, he completed the Command & General Staff College. In 1940, Williams was assigned to Fort Sam Houston, Texas. He was then assigned to the Training and Operations Office, G-3, at the War Department General Staff.

== World War II ==
During World War II, Williams served in Europe, first as commander of the 102nd Infantry Division's 405th Infantry Regiment, and later as assistant division commander of the 29th Infantry Division.

== Post-World War II ==
After World War II, Williams served the Intelligence Group of the Army's European Command.

In 1949 June Williams was appointed comptroller of SCAP.

== Korean War ==
General Williams served as comptroller of the U.S. Army's Far East Command from 1949 to 1952.

== Post-Korean War ==
From 1953 to 1954, Williams served as Assistant Comptroller of the Army. General Williams served as Comptroller of the Army from 1955 to 1957.

In early 1957, Williams was assigned to the Sixth United States Army at the Presidio, where he served until his retirement in June of that year.

== Awards and decorations ==
Williams received the Distinguished Service Medal. He was also a recipient of the Silver Star. In addition, he was presented the Legion of Merit, two Bronze Stars, and the Purple Heart.

== Retirement and death ==
In retirement, General Williams resided in La Jolla, California.

He died in San Diego, California on 6 January 1975. His remains were cremated.
