= YWCA Building (Yakima, Washington) =

Historic women's building in Washington

- Young Women's Christian Association Building
- U.S. National Register of Historic Places
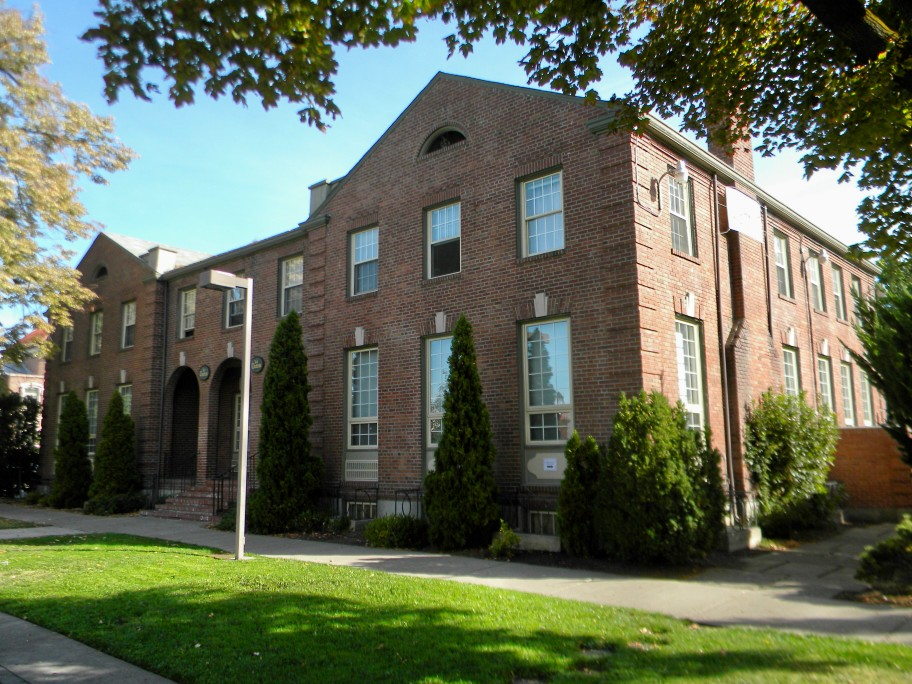
- The building in 2014

- Location within Washington (state)
- Location: 15 North Naches Avenue, Yakima, Washington 98901
- Coordinates: 46°36′17″N 120°30′00″W
- Built: 1935
- Architect: John W. Maloney
- Architectural style: Georgian Revival
- Website: chateauyakima.com
- NRHP reference No.: 93000361
- Added to NRHP: April 29, 1993

The YWCA Building, now the Chateau Yakima, is a historic Young Women's Christian Association building in downtown Yakima, Washington. It was completed in 1935 and added to the National Register of Historic Places in 1993.

== History ==
Founded in 1909, the Yakima YWCA originally rented the second floor of Sawbridge's Hardware Store and used the gym from the First Baptist Church. In 1920, the YWCA purchased the land for the building but they were not able to break ground until 1934, when a local businessperson Alexander Miller donated $80,000 toward the effort. The building opened the next year and offered job placement, a gym, a library, temporary housing, and inexpensive meals to young women.

After the YWCA vacated the building, it became the "Chateau Yakima", where the former common areas are rented for events while other sections are used as a coworking space. In 2023, the YWCA obtained the St. Elizabeth's School of Nursing building at the former Astria Regional Medical Center, and began converting it into a women's shelter.

== Architecture ==
The building is in the Georgian Revival style, although there are some Neoclassical finishes and Federal Revival interiors. Local board president Mary Remy sketched out the plans for the building and its multiple functions which architect John W. Maloney formalized into the final design. The building has a two-story gabled pavilion with a red brick running bond pattern. There are keystones over the first-floor windows.

== See also ==
- List of YWCA buildings
- YWCA Building (Seattle)
- YWCA Building (Bellingham, Washington)
- National Register of Historic Places listings in Yakima County, Washington
