= Anna Barrows =

American educator and author

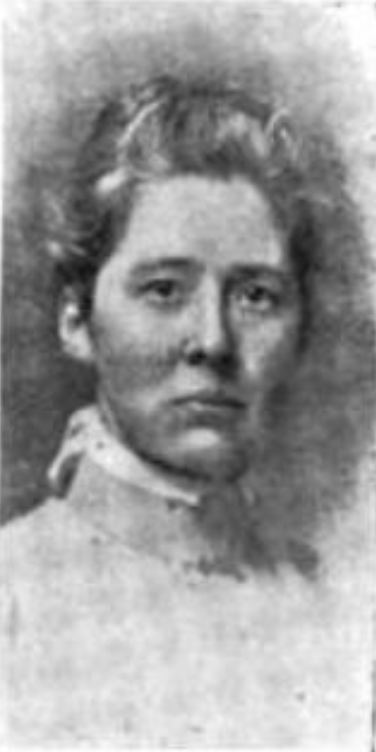
- Barrows in 1906
- Born: 1861; Fryeburg, Maine
- Died: February 11, 1948 (aged 86–87)
- Occupation(s): Educator, writer

Anna Barrows (1861 – February 11, 1948) was an American educator and author, known for being a pioneering woman in the field of home economics. She contributed to the foundation of the Home Economics Movement through her unique demonstrations, lectures, and radio interviews. She belonged to many organizations, such as the New England Woman's Press Association, the American Home Economics Association, the General Federation of Women's Clubs, the National Society of D.A.R., and the Fryeburg Women's Literary Club.

== Early life ==
Barrows was born in Fryeburg, Maine. She attended the Fryeburg Academy, and after graduating began teaching in public schools in Fryeburg and Conway, New Hampshire. She then attended the Boston Cooking School, graduating in 1886.

== Educational roles ==
Along with being a member of the School Committee of the City of Boston she held teaching positions in several nearby schools, such as the North Bennett Street Industrial School in Boston, the School of Domestic Science in Boston, the YWCA in Boston, Lasell Seminary in Auburndale, and the Robinson Female Seminary in Exeter, New Hampshire. She then went on to become the Director of the Summer School of Domestic Science in Chautauqua, N.Y., and following that she became a lecturer at the Teacher's College of Columbia University.

== Contributions ==
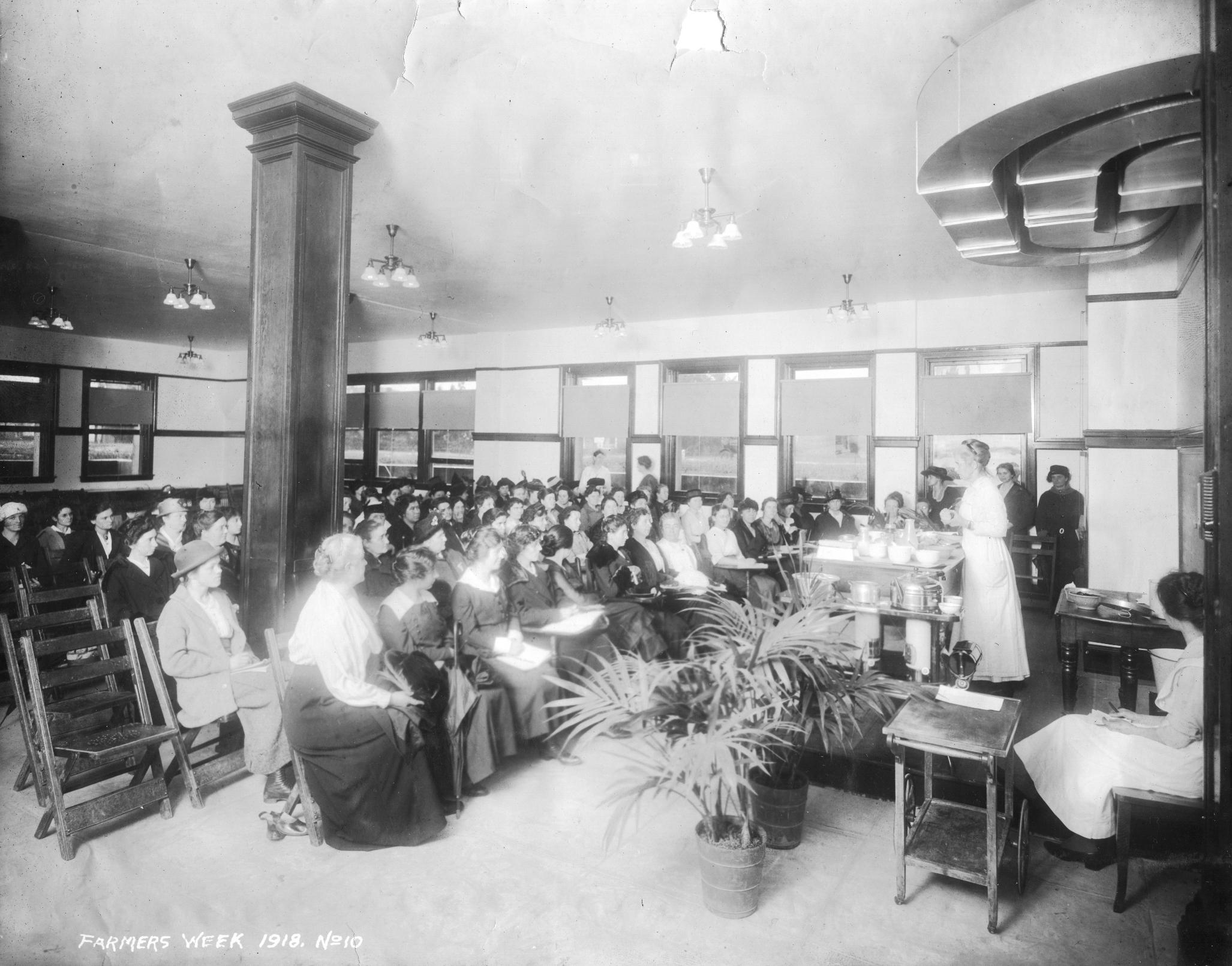
Anna Barrows (Speaking)

Barrows was known for her humorous and philosophical cooking demonstrations, which ran in high demand in the women's circles of the 1920s. Having an extensive background and passion for the history of cooking led her to become a very skillful and entertaining lecturer. She was also a key member of the Home Economics Movement, taking a crucial role in advocating culinary education.

Barrows also published several culinary books, as well as books on domestic science, and lent her influence to the Extension Work of the U.S. Department of Agriculture. Her 1907 publication Eggs: Facts and Fancies About Them, addressed many culinary techniques and applications for eggs. Other works of hers such as Principles of Cookery, her 1914 publication, were broader in their aim to teach culinary practices.

== Selected publications ==
- Eggs: Facts and Fancies About Them (1890). Boston, MA: D. Lothrop Company.
- Principles of Cookery (1914). Chicago, IL: American School of Home Economics.
