= YWCA (Evansville, Indiana) =

- U.S. National Register of Historic Places
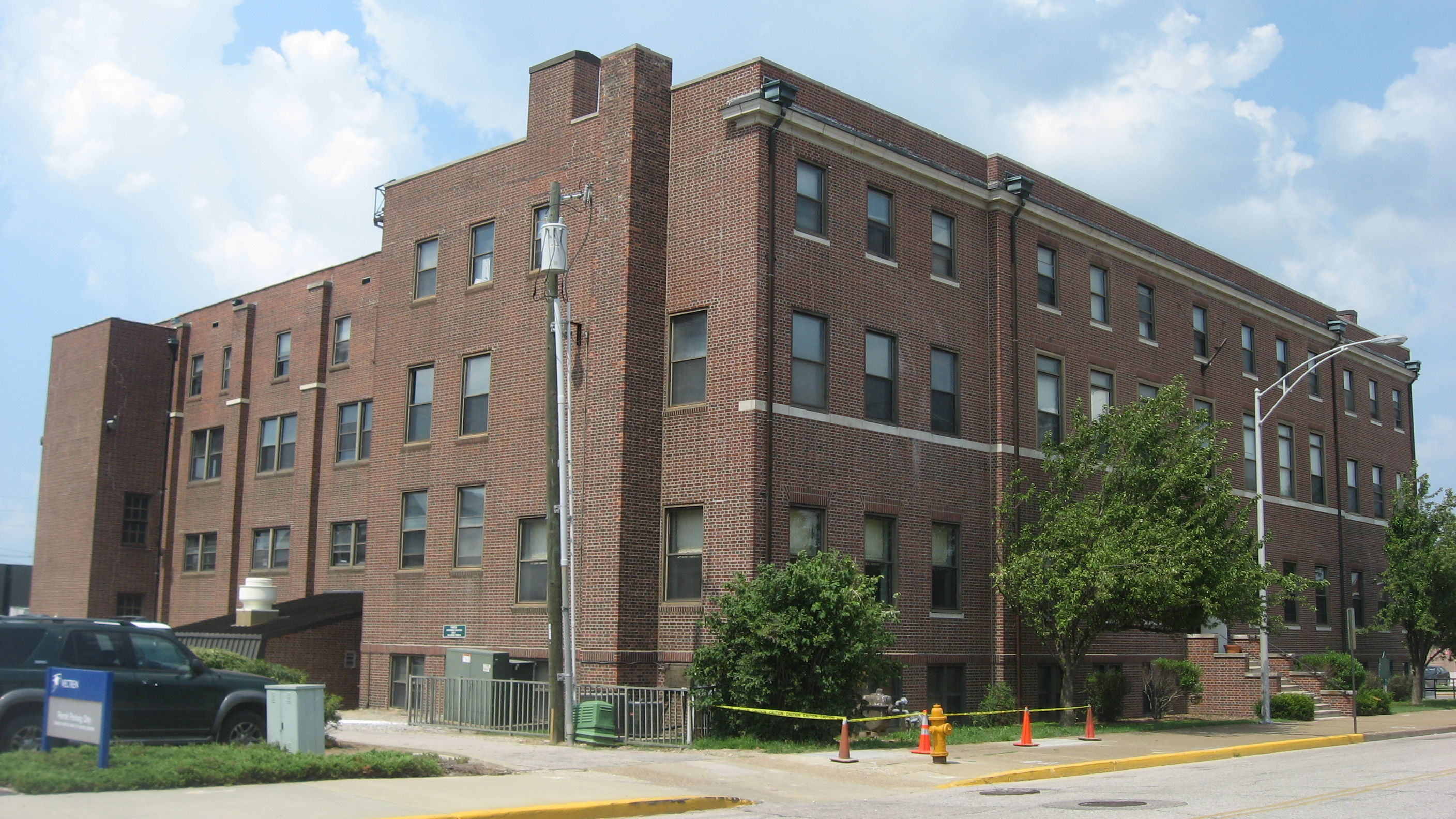
- Evansville YWCA, July 2011

- Location within Indiana Location within the United States
- Location: 118 Vine St., Evansville, Indiana
- Coordinates: 37°58′20″N 87°34′31″W
- Area: less than one acre
- Built: 1924
- Architect: Thompson, W.F., & Geary, B.G.; Anderson & Veatch
- Architectural style: Tudor Revival
- MPS: Downtown Evansville MRA
- NRHP reference No.: 82001853
- Added to NRHP: July 1, 1982

YWCA is a historic YWCA located in downtown Evansville, Indiana. It was built in 1924, and is a three-story, Tudor Revival style red brick clubhouse on a raised basement.

It was listed on the National Register of Historic Places in 1982.
