= YWCA Boston =

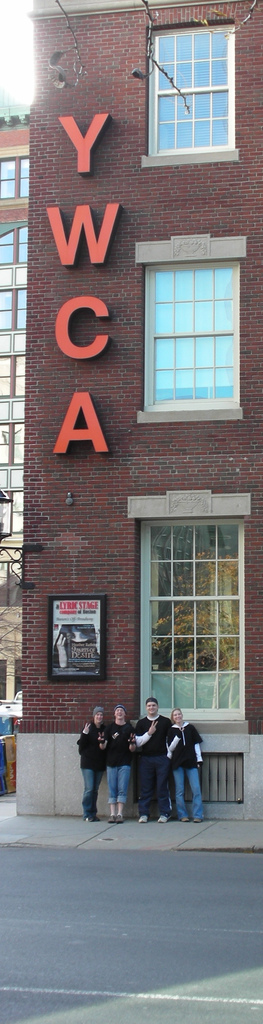
YWCA Boston, 2006

The Boston Young Women's Christian Association (YWCA) (est.1866) was founded in Boston, Massachusetts, "to aid the young working-women of Boston, without regard to their religious belief." It was incorporated in 1867 by Pauline A. Durant, Ann Maria Sawyer, Hannah A. Bowen, and Clara L. Wells. It is the United States' oldest YWCA. With a mission to eliminate racism, empower women and promote peace, justice, freedom and dignity for all, the organization has been providing services to Boston residents and visitors for 150 years.

Historically, YWCA community programs have included recreation facilities, daycare, adult and child education, and advocacy work for women and children's rights. Today, YW Boston directly serves over 3,000 Bostonians per year through its six programs: Dialogues on Race and Ethnicity, Girls' Health, LeadBoston, Women's Health, Youth Leadership Initiative, and Youth/Police Dialogues.

== History ==
=== 19th century ===
"1866—Boston organized March 3, opened rooms in May and held a singing class the first year; in 1867 opened classes in astronomy and in physiology; in 1868 in penmanship and bookkeeping."

"1868—February 19. The Boston Young Women's Christian Association opened as a boarding home for seventy-five young women the two five-story dwelling houses at 25 and 27 Beach Street. The property with additions, alterations, repairs and furnishings cost $28,000. ... The dining room was conducted on the restaurant plan and outsiders were welcome"

"1879—In March the Boston Association opened a house next the Warrenton Street home, where 'board is given to those wishing instruction in all branches of sewing and domestic work who will give their time entirely to being taught and to doing work in these different departments.' A cooking school under Mme. Farier was conducted Monday, Wednesday, and Friday, day and evening, ... and for school children on Saturday afternoon. In 1880 a class of twelve girls from the Winthrop Street school were sent by their headmaster, Mr. Swan, for a course of twelve lessons. ... An admission fee of ten cents was charged for the classes this year."

"1886—In the well-equipped gymnasium in its new Berkeley Street building [the YWCA] registered forty in the evening class for business girls, besides day classes for others. By 1890 the director, Miss Hope Narey, enrolled 300."

"1888—In September the Boston Association opened a School of Domestic Science in the Berkeley Street building. Mrs. Emma P. Ewing of Purdue University was the first lecturer and demonstrator. Mrs. Ellen H. Richards, Mrs. D. A. Lincoln and Anna Barrows were among the advisers and teachers."

"1888—Boston instituted a School of Domestic Science, which in 1890 introduced elementary (for practice work) and normal courses in educational sewing, home dressmaking and millinery."

=== 20th century ===
YWCA Boston's historic landmark headquarters at 140 Clarendon Street was built in 1929, designed by George F. Shepard and Frederic Stearns.

=== 21st century ===
In 2009, it consolidated its operations with the all-volunteer City-Wide Dialogues on Boston's Racial and Ethnic Diversity, and has expanded the breadth and scope of that program's community and youth/police interracial dialogues efforts, adding leadership development, and community action planning and implementation components to its curricula.

In 2012, YWCA Boston rebranded to YW Boston to better reflect the fact that it now a secular organization and serves people of all genders.

== Image gallery ==
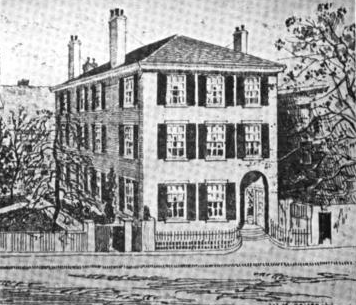
Congregational House, Chauncey St., Boston, occupied by the YWCA in its early years

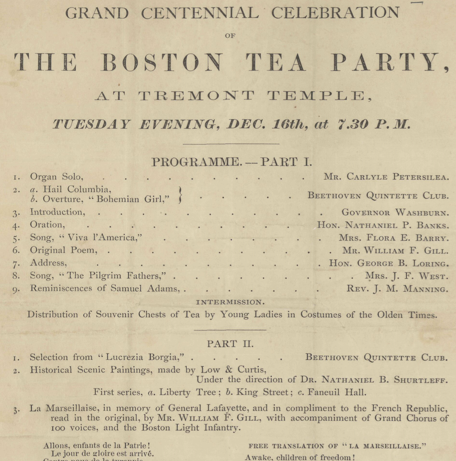
Detail of programme for Boston Tea Party centennial at Tremont Temple, benefit for Boston YWCA, 1873

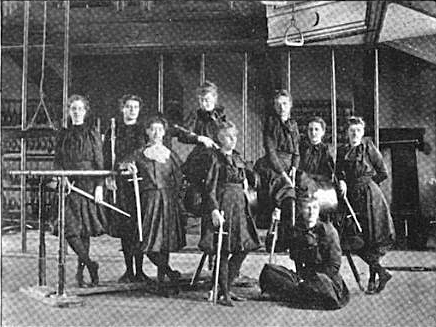
YWCA gymnasium, 1894

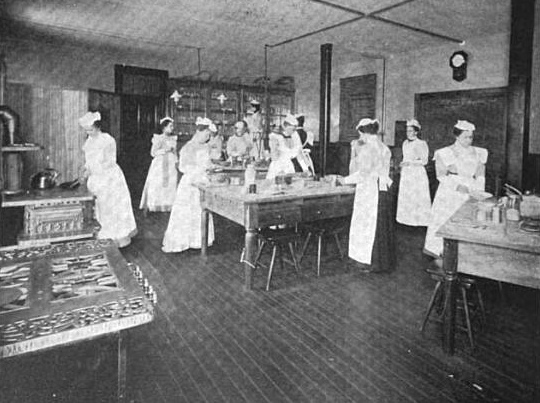
YWCA's school of domestic science, 1902

== See also ==
- YWCA Boston building (Clarendon Street)
