= Colorado Mental Health Institute at Pueblo =

Colorado state hospital (1883–1962)

Coordinates: 38.288°N 104.629°W

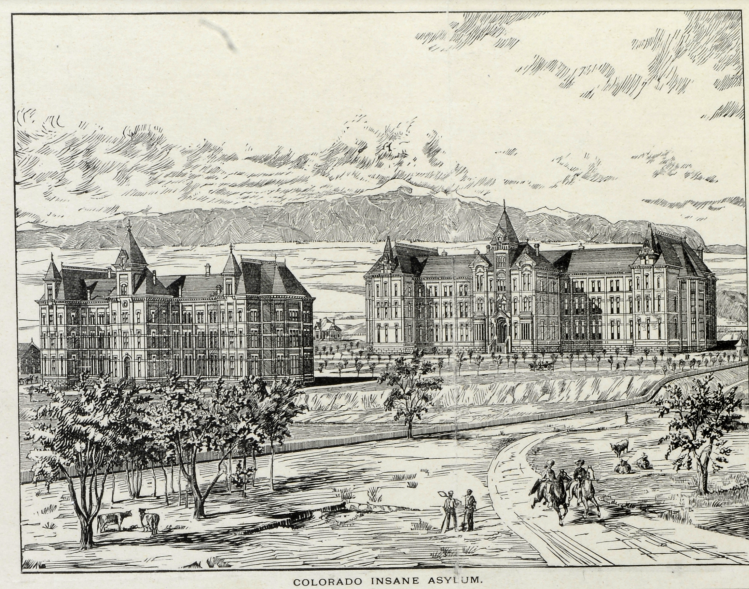
This drawn image of the State Asylum first appeared in the illustrated supplement of the Pueblo Chieftain on May 6th, 1888. It appeared alongside drawings of numerous other unique buildings throughout Pueblo.

The Colorado State Mental Hospital at Pueblo was Colorado state's largest institution dedicated to caring for the mentally ill until 1962, when the process of regional decentralization resulted in it only serving the Pueblo area. The hospital itself first began operating in the 1880s. The main building of the hospital was opened on November 20, 1883. This early iteration of the Asylum was capable of holding 210 people across 6 wards and was generally equally divided between male and female patients. Asylum leadership consistently had to deal with overcrowding. To combat this, many additions were made to the hospital throughout the late 19th and early 20th centuries. In early 1889 it was reported in the Leadville Daily Times that the hospital had requested a total of $93,436.27 for new constructions on their grounds. These additions did not permanently solve the overcrowding issue, which was addressed through new constructions up until the 1960s. In 1946, the hospital had 4,811 patients enrolled. The majority of the patients came from Colorado's three largest cities, Denver, Pueblo, and Colorado Springs, which made up over half of those receiving care at the hospital and their respective counties totaled 3,183 patients. Patient care and the constant need for new constructions led the hospital towards a difficult financial situation. In 1947, a special legislative committee indicated that they would be selling the Woodcroft portion of the hospital due to its poor condition and financial burden

The hospital continued to expand up until 1962, when geographic decentralization led to the establishment of regional treatment hospitals that were located close to the patients home community. This resulted in smaller hospital units that were more able to provide intimate and personalized care. Currently, the hospital encompasses a 300-acre campus with numerous buildings for mental healthcare. In 2022, the hospital is capable of caring for 516 patients and cares for children, adults, and the elderly. The hospital also cares for those who were deemed incompetent after criminal proceedings or are still pending such a judgement.

== Founder ==
Hubert Work, born July 3, 1860, was the founder of the Colorado State Hospital, that had opened November 20, 1883. Work wanted to do something to help those who suffered with the "social curse of feeblemindedness". He thought that "mental weaknesses should be eradicated instead of just treated".

Work believed that there were two ways of treatment for those who were having to deal with mental illness. He believed that the segregation of the abnormal at puberty by holding them in institutions during their procreative period or rendering them sterile.

== Notable Patients ==
- Ed Benge
