= YWCA Boston building (Clarendon Street) =

- YWCA Boston
- U.S. National Register of Historic Places
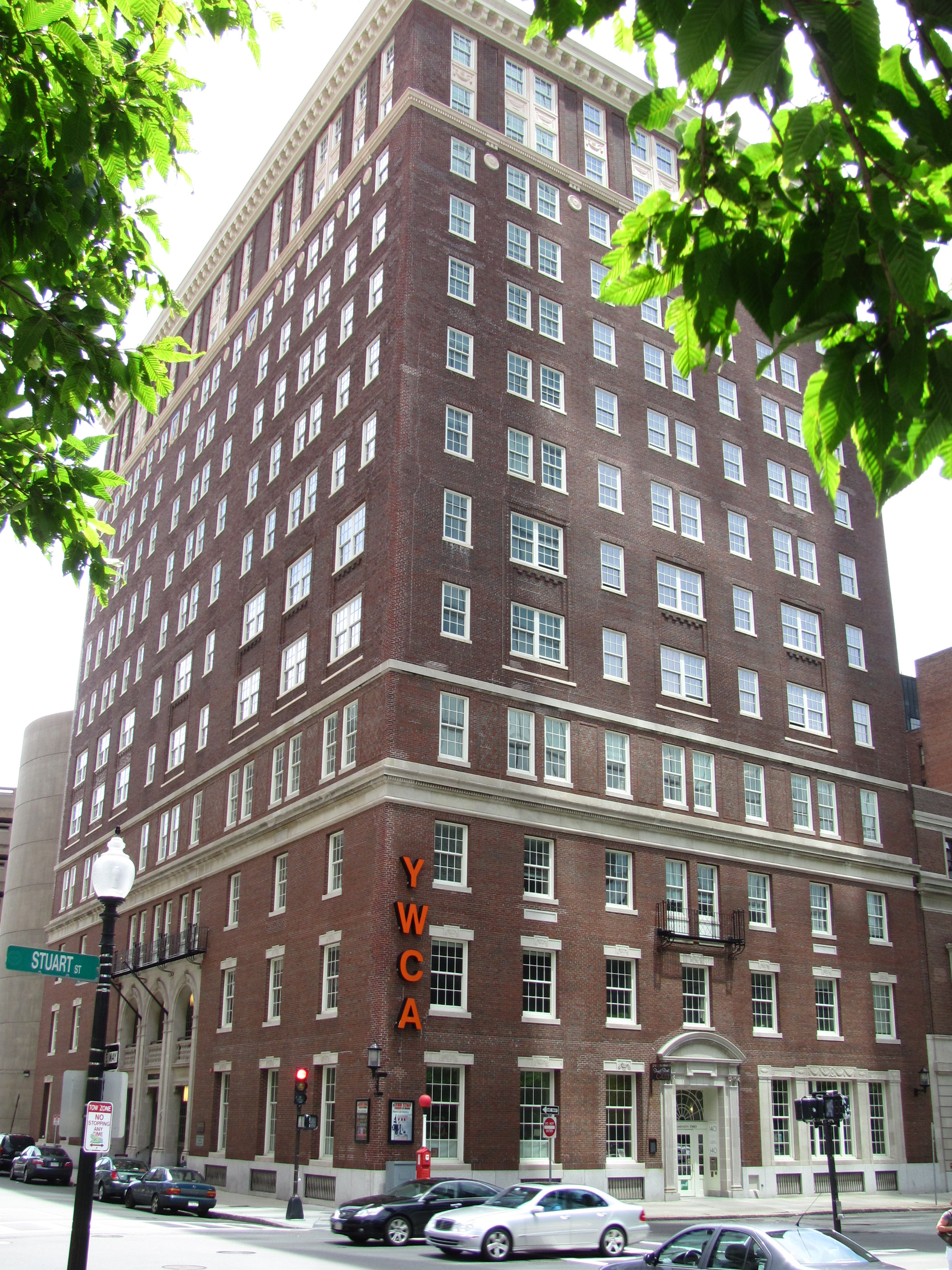
- YWCA on Clarendon Street

- Location within Boston Location within Massachusetts Location within the United States
- Location: 140 Clarendon St., Boston, Massachusetts
- Coordinates: 42°20′55.06″N 71°4′27.74″W
- Area: less than one acre
- Built: 1929
- Architect: Shepard & Stearns; Root, Henry
- Architectural style: Classical Revival
- NRHP reference No.: 04000119
- Added to NRHP: March 3, 2004

The YWCA Boston building is a historic building located at 140 Clarendon Street in the Back Bay neighborhood of Boston, Massachusetts. The 13-story brick-faced steel-frame building was designed by Shepard & Stearns and built in 1929. The building once housed an indoor swimming pool and recreation facilities for the YWCA Boston; it is now operated by Clarendon Residences LLC, which provides affordable and market-rate housing, the boutique hotel Hotel 140, facilities for the Lyric Stage of Boston and Snowden International High School, and corporate offices for several small and mid-sized for-profit and not-for-profit tenants.

The building was listed on the National Register of Historic Places in 2004.

== See also ==
- National Register of Historic Places listings in northern Boston, Massachusetts
