= YWCA (Muncie, Indiana) =

- U.S. National Register of Historic Places
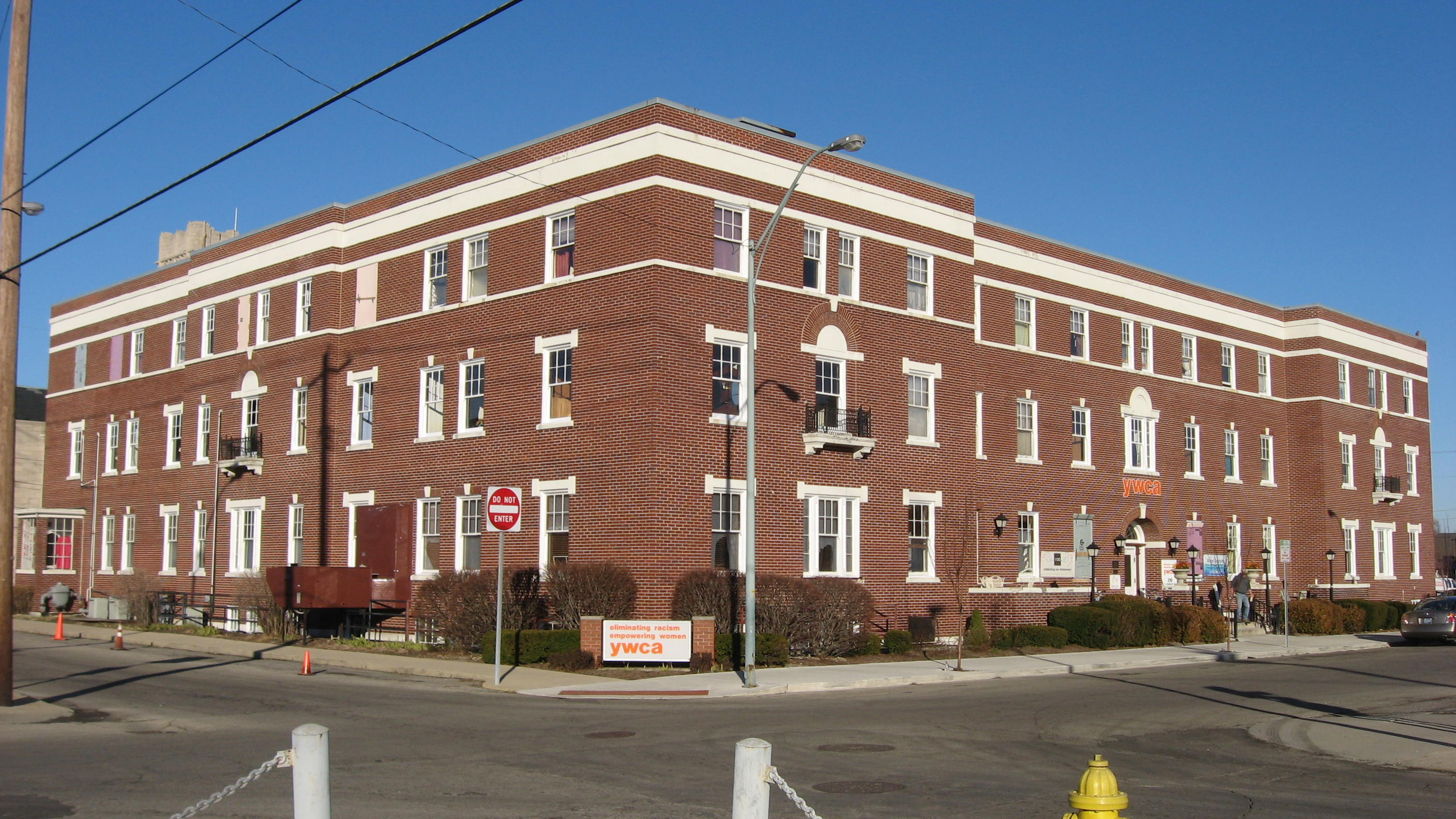
- Muncie YWCA, January 2012

- Location within Indiana Location within the United States
- Location: 310 E. Charles St., Muncie, Indiana
- Coordinates: 40°11′28″N 85°23′2″W
- Area: less than one acre
- Built: 1925
- Architect: Kibele & Girard; Monroe, Charles P.
- MPS: Downtown Muncie MRA
- NRHP reference No.: 88002117
- Added to NRHP: February 17, 1989

The Young Women's Christian Association at 310 E. Charles St. is a historic YWCA building located at Muncie, Indiana. It was built in 1925, and is a three-story, five bay by three bay, restrained Colonial Revival style brick building with limestone detailing. It has swimming pool in the basement, meeting and recreation rooms on the first floor, and sleeping rooms on the second and third floors.

The Indiana gas boom caused a population boom in Muncie in the late 1800s and early 1900s. The city housed a large population of young female factory workers by the 1910s, when interest in forming a local branch of the YWCA emerged. The Ball brothers helped to fund the construction of the building.

It was added to the National Register of Historic Places in 1989.
