= Kensington Branch of the Philadelphia YWCA =

- U.S. National Register of Historic Places
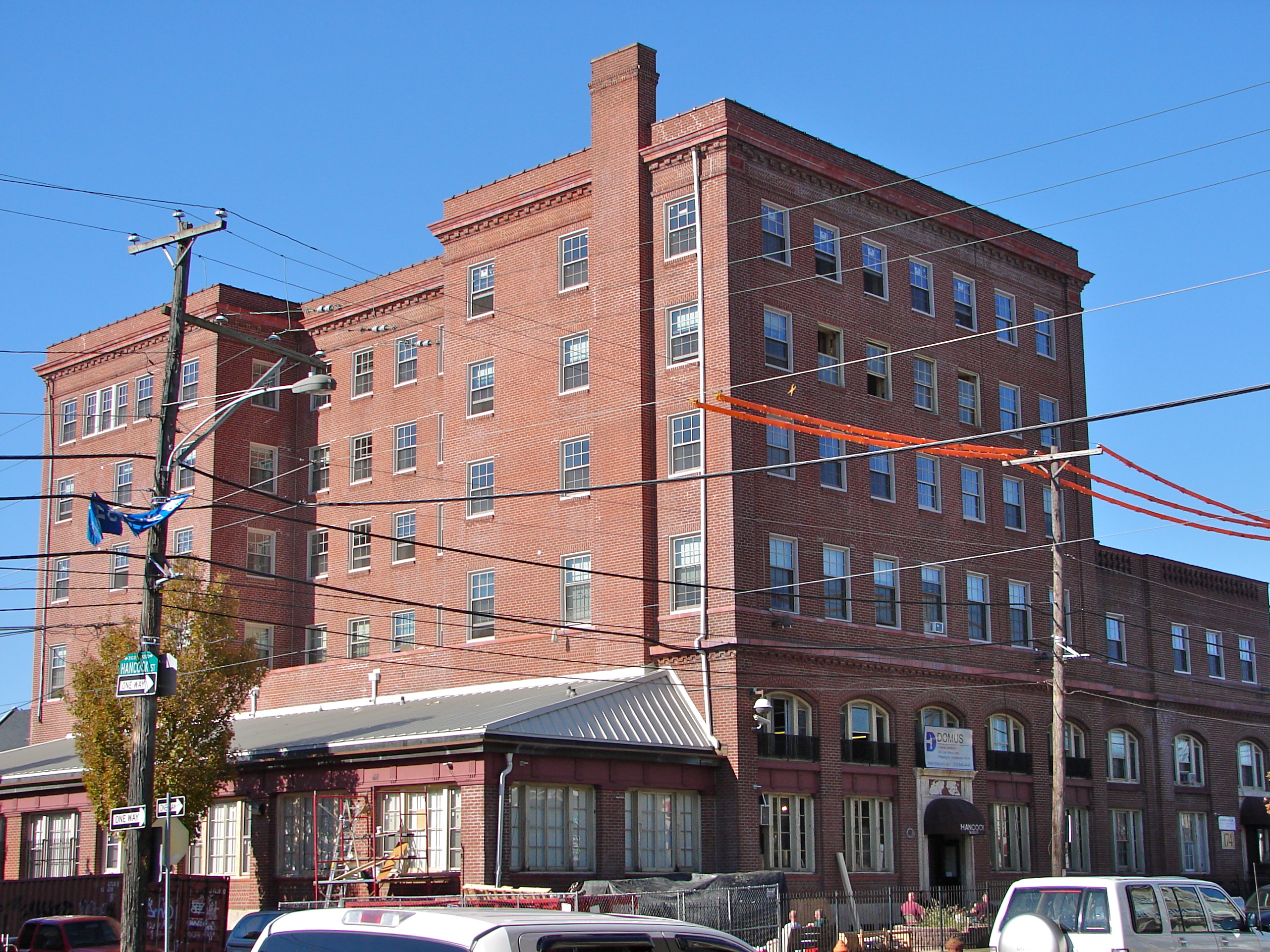
- Kensington Branch of the Philadelphia YWCA, September 2010

- Location within Philadelphia Location within Pennsylvania Location within the United States
- Location: 174 W. Allegheny Ave., Philadelphia, Pennsylvania
- Coordinates: 39.998660°N 75.133068°W
- Area: 0.3 acres (0.12 ha)
- Built: 1911, 1916
- Architect: Hewitt, Granger & Paist
- Architectural style: Colonial Revival
- NRHP reference No.: 90000415
- Added to NRHP: March 9, 1990

Kensington Branch of the Philadelphia YWCA is a historic YWCA building located in the Hugh neighborhood of Philadelphia, Pennsylvania. It was built in 1911 and expanded in 1916. It is a six-story, brick with terracotta trim building in the Colonial Revival style. The original three-story section was built as the Hoffman Memorial wing.

It was added to the National Register of Historic Places in 1990.
