= National Register of Historic Places listings in Clarke County, Georgia =

NRHP sites in Clarke County, Georgia

This is a list of properties and districts in Clarke County, Georgia that are listed on the National Register of Historic Places (NRHP).

This National Park Service list is complete through NPS recent listings posted January 16, 2026.

== Current listings ==
	Name on the Register	Image	Date listed	Location	City or town	Description
1	Athens Factory	Athens Factory	July 31, 1980 (#80000989)	Baldwin and Williams Sts. 33°57′10″N 83°22′10″W	Athens	
2	Athens Manufacturing Company	Athens Manufacturing Company	December 31, 2002 (#02001634)	585 While Circle; 33°54′20″N 83°21′28″W	Athens	
3	Athens Warehouse Historic District	Athens Warehouse Historic District	October 20, 1988 (#88002021)	Roughly bounded by Hancock and Thomas Sts., and the RR tracks 33°57′32″N 83°22′17″W	Athens	
4	Bishop House	Bishop House	March 16, 1972 (#72000375)	Jackson St., University of Georgia campus 33°57′21″N 83°22′23″W	Athens	
5	Bloomfield Street Historic District	Bloomfield Street Historic District	April 18, 1985 (#85000850)	Roughly bounded by Bloomfield and Peabody Sts., U of G campus, Rutherford St and Milledge Ave. 33°56′44″N 83°23′06″W	Athens	
6	Boulevard Historic District	Boulevard Historic District	April 18, 1985 (#85000851)	Roughly bounded by the Seaboard Coastline RR tracks, Pulaski St., Prince Ave., and Hiawassee St. 33°57′54″N 83°23′23″W	Athens	
7	Brightwell Shotgun Row	Brightwell Shotgun Row	June 14, 2001 (#01000642)	366-376 Barber St. 33°57′59″N 83°23′08″W	Athens	
8	Buena Vista Heights Historic District	Buena Vista Heights Historic District	August 27, 1999 (#99001029)	Roughly bounded by Park Ave., Prince Ave., Pound St., and Nantahala Extension; 33°57′58″N 83°24′06″W	Athens	
9	Camak House	Camak House	July 7, 1975 (#75000576)	279 Meigs St. 33°57′34″N 83°23′00″W	Athens	
10	Carnegie Library Building	Carnegie Library Building	November 11, 1975 (#75000577)	1401 Prince Ave. 33°57′50″N 83°24′16″W	Athens	
11	Albon Chase House	Albon Chase House	August 19, 1974 (#74002255)	185 N. Hull St. 33°57′27″N 83°22′45″W	Athens	
12	Chestnut Grove School	Chestnut Grove School	June 28, 1984 (#84003873)	610 Epps Bridge Rd. 33°55′59″N 83°26′18″W	Athens	
13	Chi Omega House	Chi Omega House	July 11, 2019 (#100003491)	324 S. Milledge Ave. 33°57′09″N 83°23′16″W	Athens	
14	Church-Waddel-Brumby House	Church-Waddel-Brumby House	February 20, 1975 (#75000578)	280 E. Dougherty St. 33°57′43″N 83°22′33″W	Athens	
15	Clarke County Jail	Clarke County Jail	May 29, 1980 (#80000990)	Courthouse Sq. 33°57′34″N 83°23′06″W	Athens	
16	T. R. R. Cobb House	T. R. R. Cobb House	June 30, 1975 (#75000579)	194 Prince Ave. 33°57′40″N 83°22′54″W	Athens	De-listed in 1985, but re-listed on July 23, 2013
17	Cobb-Treanor House	Cobb-Treanor House	May 8, 1979 (#79000705)	1234 S. Lumpkin St. 33°56′42″N 83°22′46″W	Athens	
18	Cobbham Historic District	Cobbham Historic District	August 24, 1978 (#78000973)	Roughly bounded by Prince Ave., Hill, Reese, and Pope Sts. 33°57′32″N 83°23′31″W	Athens	
19	Coca-Cola Bottling Plant-Athens	Coca-Cola Bottling Plant-Athens	February 1, 2006 (#05001594)	297 Prince Ave. 33°57′35″N 83°23′00″W	Athens	
20	Ross Crane House	Ross Crane House	June 18, 1979 (#79000706)	247 Pulaski St. 33°57′30″N 83°22′51″W	Athens	
21	Dearing Street Historic District	Dearing Street Historic District	September 5, 1975 (#75000580)	Roughly bounded by Broad and Baxter Sts., Milledge Ave., and includes both sides of Finley St. and Henderson Ave. 33°57′11″N 83°23′07″W	Athens	includes the Tree That Owns Itself
22	Albin P. Dearing House	Albin P. Dearing House	May 8, 1979 (#79000707)	338 S. Milledge Ave. 33°57′07″N 83°23′16″W	Athens	Now Kappa Alpha Theta house
23	Downtown Athens Historic District	Downtown Athens Historic District	August 10, 1978 (#78000974)	Roughly bounded by Hancock Ave., Foundry, Mitchell; 33°57′30″N 83°22′25″W	Athens	There was a boundary increase on May 31, 1984 (refnum 84000965), and a boundary increase and decrease on August 18, 2006 (refnum 06000737)
24	First African Methodist Episcopal Church	First African Methodist Episcopal Church	March 10, 1980 (#80000991)	521 N. Hull St. 33°57′39″N 83°22′46″W	Athens	
25	Franklin House	Franklin House	December 11, 1974 (#74000667)	464-480 E. Broad St. 33°57′28″N 83°22′35″W	Athens	
26	Garden Club of Georgia Museum-Headquarters House, Founder's Memorial Garden	Garden Club of Georgia Museum-Headquarters House, Founder's Memorial Garden	April 26, 1972 (#72000376)	Lumpkin St., University of Georgia campus 33°57′15″N 83°22′33″W	Athens	
27	Gospel Pilgrim Cemetery	Gospel Pilgrim Cemetery	April 19, 2006 (#06000285)	530 Fourth St. 33°58′09″N 83°21′41″W	Athens	
28	Henry W. Grady House	Henry W. Grady House	May 11, 1976 (#76000613)	634 Prince Ave. 33°57′42″N 83°23′18″W	Athens	National Historic Landmark
29	Dr. James S. Hamilton House	Dr. James S. Hamilton House	April 24, 1979 (#79000708)	150 S. Milledge Ave. 33°57′16″N 83°23′19″W	Athens	
30	Jackson Street Cemetery	Jackson Street Cemetery	October 2, 2009 (#09000779)	S. Jackson St., University of Georgia campus 33°57′21″N 83°22′25″W	Athens	
31	Lucy Cobb Institute Campus	Lucy Cobb Institute Campus	March 16, 1972 (#72000377)	200 N. Milledge Ave., University of Georgia campus 33°57′22″N 83°23′23″W	Athens	
32	Gov. Wilson Lumpkin House	Gov. Wilson Lumpkin House	March 16, 1972 (#72000378)	Cedar St., University of Georgia campus 33°56′51″N 83°22′26″W	Athens	
33	Joseph Henry Lumpkin House	Joseph Henry Lumpkin House	June 27, 1975 (#75000581)	248 Prince Ave. 33°57′38″N 83°22′57″W	Athens	
34	Milledge Avenue Historic District	Milledge Avenue Historic District	April 18, 1985 (#85000852)	Milledge Ave. from Broad St. to Five Points; 33°56′52″N 83°23′16″W	Athens	Boundary increase (listed September 24, 2009): 295 W. Rutherford St.
35	Milledge Circle Historic District	Milledge Circle Historic District	April 18, 1985 (#85000859)	Milledge Park, Lumpkin St., Milledge Circle and Milledge Ave. 33°56′15″N 83°23′22″W	Athens	
36	Morton Building	Morton Building	October 22, 1979 (#79000709)	199 W. Washington St. 33°57′31″N 83°22′43″W	Athens	
37	Newton House	Newton House	July 11, 2002 (#02000759)	892 Prince Ave. 33°57′43″N 83°23′34″W	Athens	
38	Oconee Hill Cemetery	Oconee Hill Cemetery	May 22, 2013 (#13000291)	297 Cemetery St. 33°57′04″N 83°22′06″W	Athens	
39	Oconee Street School		December 31, 2018 (#100003284)	594 Oconee St. 33°57′09″N 83°21′59″W	Athens	
40	Oglethorpe Avenue Historic District	Oglethorpe Avenue Historic District	November 5, 1987 (#87001360)	Oglethorpe Ave. 33°57′58″N 83°24′15″W	Athens	
41	Old North Campus, University of Georgia	Old North Campus, University of Georgia	March 16, 1972 (#72000379)	Bounded by Broad, Lumpkin, and Jackson Sts. 33°58′01″N 83°22′30″W	Athens	
42	Hubert Bond Owens House	Hubert Bond Owens House	May 14, 2008 (#08000442)	215 W. Rutherford St. 33°56′34″N 83°23′10″W	Athens	
43	Calvin W. Parr House	Calvin W. Parr House	September 9, 1982 (#82002394)	227 Bloomfield St. 33°56′53″N 83°23′09″W	Athens	
44	Parrott Insurance Building	Parrott Insurance Building	October 7, 1977 (#77000416)	283 E. Broad St. 33°57′28″N 83°22′30″W	Athens	
45	President's House	President's House	March 16, 1972 (#72000380)	570 Prince Ave. 33°57′41″N 83°23′11″W	Athens	
46	Reese Street Historic District	Reese Street Historic District	November 10, 1987 (#87001990)	Roughly bounded by Meigs, Finley, Broad, & Harris Sts. 33°57′26″N 83°23′06″W	Athens	Includes the Hill First Baptist Church.
47	Rocksprings Shotgun Row Historic District	Rocksprings Shotgun Row Historic District	August 23, 1996 (#96000875)	433-447 Rocksprings St. 33°56′50″N 83°23′29″W	Athens	
48	James A. Sledge House	James A. Sledge House	February 12, 1974 (#74000668)	749 Cobb St. 33°57′37″N 83°23′49″W	Athens	
49	R. P. Sorrells House	R. P. Sorrells House	January 22, 1992 (#91002003)	220 Prince Ave. 33°57′38″N 83°22′56″W	Athens	
50	Thomas-Carithers House	Thomas-Carithers House	May 8, 1979 (#79000710)	530 S. Milledge Ave. 33°56′56″N 83°23′16″W	Athens	
51	Upson House	Upson House	November 15, 1973 (#73000616)	1022 Prince Ave. 33°57′14″N 83°23′40″W	Athens	
52	United States Post Office and Courthouse	United States Post Office and Courthouse	September 10, 2014 (#14000554)	115 E. Hancock St. 33°57′36″N 83°22′38″W	Athens	
53	Ware-Lyndon House	Ware-Lyndon House	March 15, 1976 (#76000614)	293 Hoyt St. 33°57′50″N 83°22′35″W	Athens	
54	West Cloverhurst Avenue Historic District	West Cloverhurst Avenue Historic District	September 27, 2007 (#07001000)	W. Cloverhurst Ave. vet. Springdale St. and S. Milledge Ave. 33°56′39″N 83°23′30″W	Athens	
55	West Hancock Avenue Historic District	West Hancock Avenue Historic District	March 30, 1988 (#88000227)	Roughly bounded by Hill, Franklin, Broad Sts. and the Plaza; 33°57′20″N 83°23′38″W	Athens	
56	White Hall	White Hall	June 18, 1979 (#79000711)	Whitehall and Simonton Bridge Rds. 33°53′48″N 83°21′50″W	Whitehall	
57	Wilkins House	Wilkins House	May 19, 1970 (#70000202)	387 S. Milledge Ave. 33°57′04″N 83°23′12″W	Athens	
58	Winterville Historic District	Winterville Historic District	October 11, 2001 (#01000742)	Roughly center on Main St. and on the abandoned Georgia RR line within the city limits of Winterville; 33°58′03″N 83°16′40″W	Winterville	
59	Woodlawn Historic District	Woodlawn Historic District	October 23, 1987 (#87001390)	Woodlawn Ave. 33°56′31″N 83°22′53″W	Athens	
60	Young Women's Christian Association Complex	Young Women's Christian Association Complex	May 12, 1987 (#87000696)	345-347 W. Hancock St. 33°57′31″N 83°22′51″W	Athens	
