= Senator Nesbitt =

Senator Nesbitt may refer to:

- Aric Nesbitt (born 1980), Michigan State Senate
- Martin Nesbitt (politician) (1946–2014), North Carolina Senate
- Robert Taylor Nesbitt (1843–1913), Georgia State Senate
