= Union Chapel, Marietta, Georgia =

Coordinates: 33°55′15″N 84°34′45″W

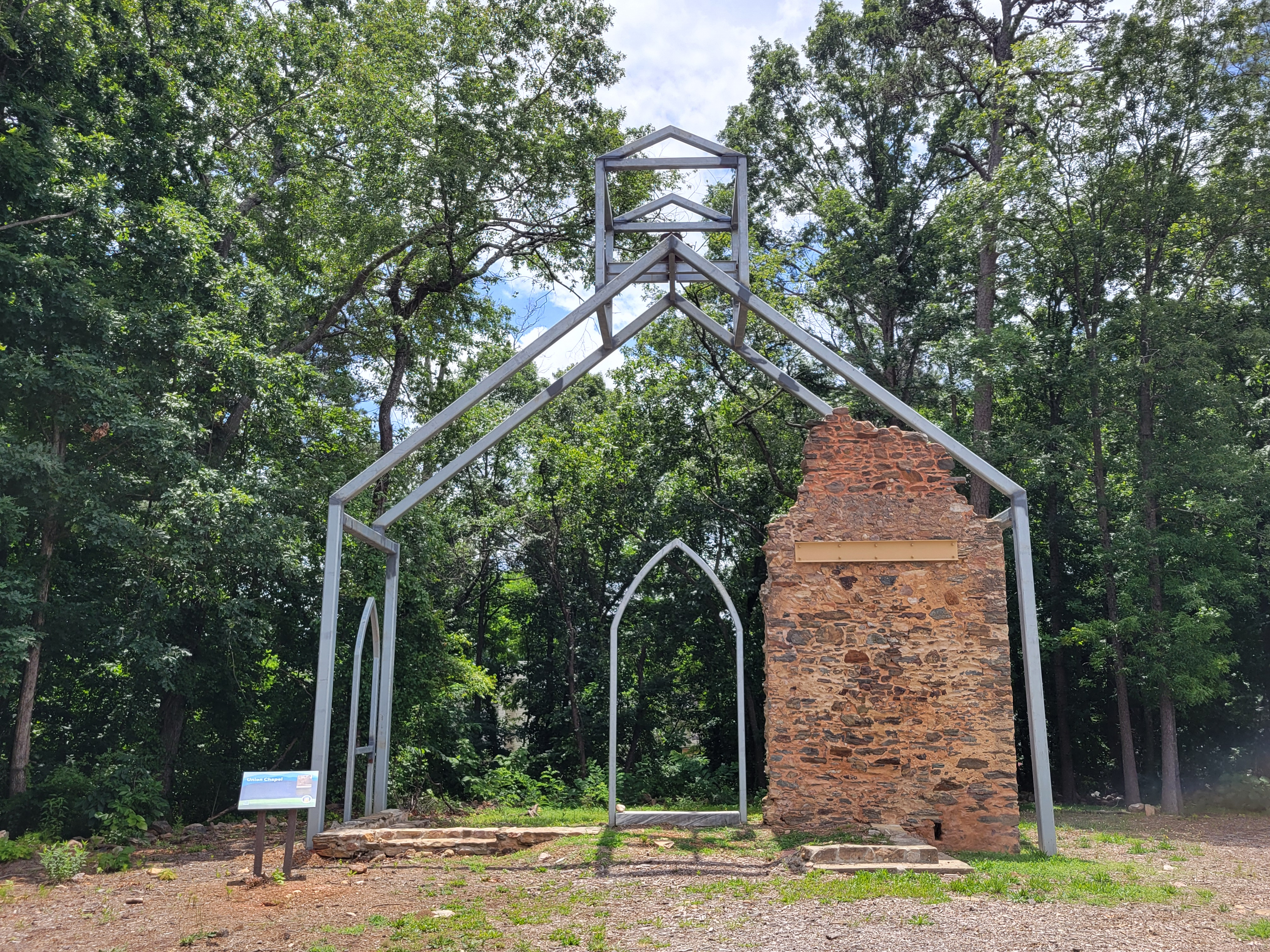
Ruins of Union Chapel

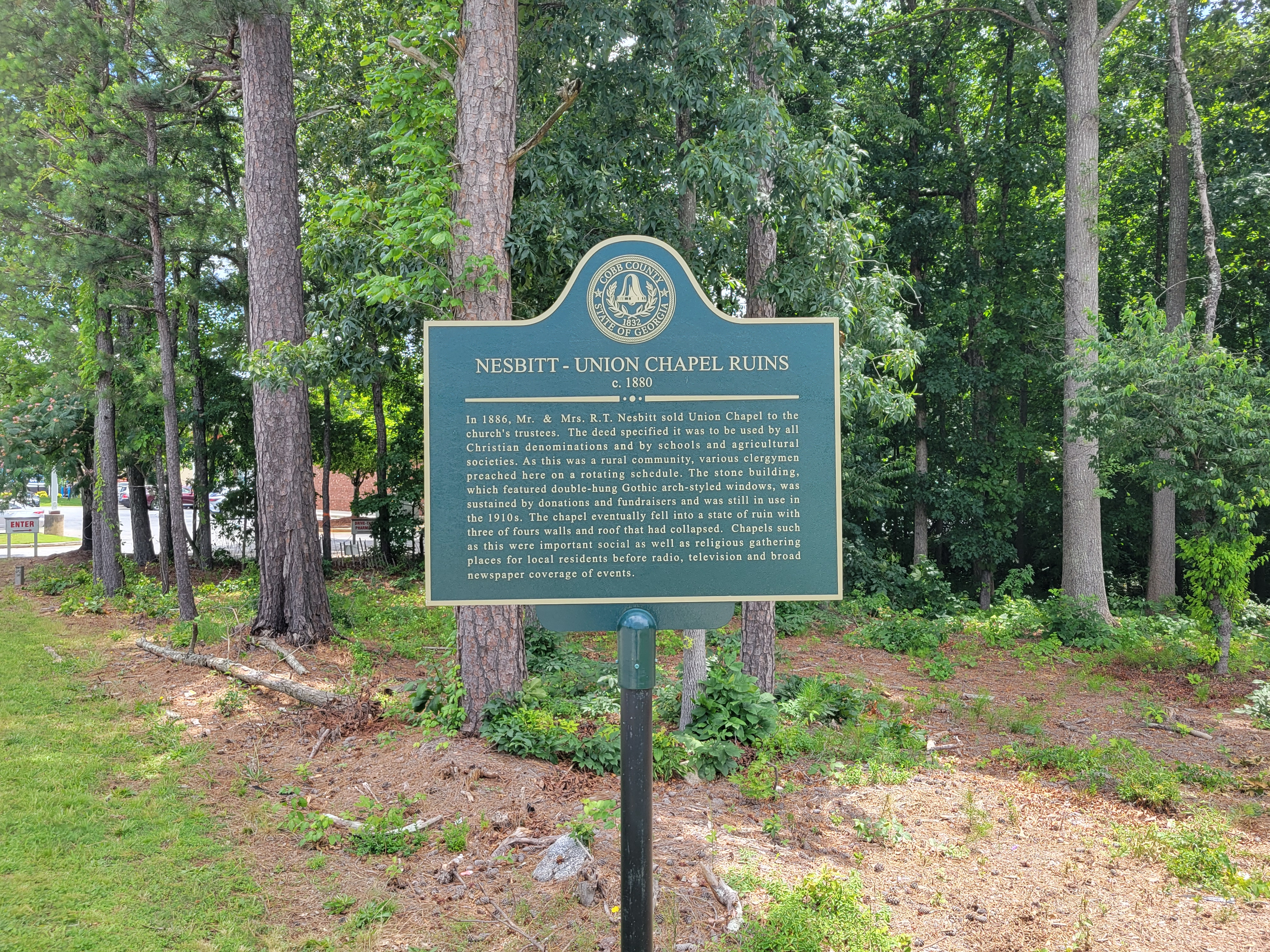
Nesbitt-Union Chapel Ruins historical marker

The ruins of Union Chapel, also known as Nesbitt Union Chapel, are situated on Powder Springs Street between Marietta and Powder Springs, in Marietta, Georgia. The original chapel consisted of a single room, with a stony façade and Gothic-style arched windows and door. The building had deteriorated significantly by the 1940s, becoming unsafe for use. By the early 21st Century only a corner of the original has remained standing. The Nesbitt/Union Chapel played a significant role in the religious, social, and agricultural history of Cobb County, in addition to its association with several of the County's prominent, early families. Currently, the Chapel ruins are barely visible from the road, obscured by trees and heavy underbrush. The ruins of the Nesbitt Union Chapel, constructed of rammed earth in the Gothic Revival style, are architecturally significant for the unusual material and a style uncommon in religious architecture in rural Georgia.

As a center of worship, the Chapel is both unusual and significant in its inclusion of all denominations. Its location three miles distant from Marietta seems trivial today, though undertaking that journey along dirt roads in a horse-drawn buggy would have been arduous even under ideal conditions. The Chapel allowed local families to worship close to home, regardless of their religious affiliation. Several Marietta congregations adopted the Chapel as a mission, rotating services for Baptist, Methodist, Episcopal, and Presbyterian parishioners. The inter-denominational nature of the Chapel reflected its group of Trustees, which included Episcopalians (Irwin and Starnes), Presbyterians (Nesbitt), and Baptists (Ward).

== Land history ==
The earliest reference to the property—2nd Section, 17th District, Land Lot 7—is in the 1832 Gold Lottery of Georgia, when it was deeded to William Alexander. A warranty deed recorded September 7, 1882, documents a transaction between Marietta Savings Bank and R.L., possibly Rebecca Lanier, Nesbitt (Cobb County Deed Book G, p. 203). The property was deeded by Robert T. and Rebecca Nesbitt to a group of five trustees in December 1886 (Cobb County Deed Book J, p. 24). Those trustees were James G. Hughes, Robert C. Irwin, Robert T. Nesbitt, Hugh N. Starnes, and John R. Ward.

== Legal history ==
The property legally remained in this trusteeship, as long as it was used for the purposes stated in the 1886 deed. Though the structure fell into disrepair, the trustees and local residents continued to meet and worship on the property, in an effort to hold to the original, legal document. Around 1972, the property appears in a Sheriff's Tax Deed. The tax exemption on the property had apparently been removed and taxes were reported as owed. It remains unclear how a local landowner gained control of the parcel, but property taxes were paid on the land until 2004.

== Chapel site returned to the public ==
Some local residents still gathered and worshipped on the site until the official formation of the Friends of Nesbitt Union Chapel (FUNC), a non-profit task force of the Cobb Land Trust, in 2002. At that time, small events and services were held on the site with the intention of honoring the provisos of the 1886 deed. The FNUC undertook a lengthy legal fight with the Clarkes to regain control of the property, spurred on by the demolition in 2004 of most of the remaining structure. In 2010, Cobb Superior Court named the Cobb County Commissioners as trustees of the property, which continues to be used for educational and worship purposes, primarily by the members of the FNUC. The organization hopes to expand these functions in the future, following a rehabilitation of the site by Cobb County.

== 1886 chapel building ==
A wood-framed, pointed-arch door with marble lintel provided entrance to the building in the center of the north façade, facing Powder Springs Road. A lancet-arch vent with wooden louvers was centered above the door. The doorway was covered by a wooden porch, with shingled, shed roof, supported by slender wood posts and brackets. The stoop, approached by two steps, consisted of stone topped with wood planks. The wood steeple was centrally positioned along the ridgeline. Its shingled roof flared out at the corners and was supported by rounded arches on all four sides. The base of the steeple was clad in board and batten siding. The steeple contained a cast iron cupola bell manufactured by Thomas Kane and Company, of Chicago, Illinois. The bell remained in situ until the mid-twentieth century.

Four lancet-arch windows lined the east and west facades of the Chapel. The double-hung windows had marble sills and louvered, wooden shutters. On the south façade, two double-hung, lancet-arch windows flanked a semicircular apse protruding from the building.

The interior walls of the Chapel were covered with white plaster and the floor with wood planks. At the north end, a carved pulpit stood on a wood dais accessed by two steps at each end. A wood stove probably occupied the northeast corner of the building, based on the presence of a stovepipe in several photographs. Wood pews occupied the sanctuary and were donated to St. James Episcopal Church in Marietta following the deterioration of the Chapel.

Receipts and numerous personal accounts indicate that there was an organ in the sanctuary, purchased from the Estey Organ Company in downtown Atlanta, on May 12, 1881 (Fig. 12). Estey, based in Brattleboro, Vermont, was the primary manufacturer of reed organs in the late 19th and early 20th centuries. Reed organs were more portable than later pipe models, and therefore better suited to small churches like Nesbitt/Union.

No other extant structures remain on the property, though personal accounts and oral histories mention a school on the property. In A Woman's Place: 52 Women of Cobb County, Georgia, 1850-1981, Mary Anne Irwin refers to "the two to three rooms of the Old Union Chapel School," where she taught for over thirty years. It remains unclear whether the school was located in a separate building or classes were held in the Chapel. Another structure notably absent from the property is the privy, though personal accounts indicate it stood in the southeast corner of the property.

== Developmental history ==
Marietta and the surrounding area were settled and thriving well before the founding of Atlanta. Chartered by the state in 1834, the town was named for Mary Cobb, the wife of United States Senator Thomas W. Cobb, for whom the county was named. As was the case with so many early Georgia communities, the railroad was the catalyst for growth and development in Marietta. The Western & Atlantic line connected Marthasville—known today as Atlanta—with Marietta in 1845. Situated at over 1000 feet above sea level and blessed with abundant natural springs, Marietta provided a cool respite from the oppressive summer weather. Hotels, boarding houses, and restaurants sprang up near the railroad to accommodate seasonal visitors. The town quickly became a popular getaway location for wealthy planters from south and coastal Georgia.

=== The Nesbitt family ===
Some of these summer visitors chose to relocate permanently to Marietta, including Robert Taylor Nesbitt, a descendant of one of Georgia's most distinguished families. Nesbitt's mother, Martha Deloney Berrien Nesbitt Duncan (1820-1896), hailed from Savannah, where her father, Richard Berrien, was a prominent physician. He died in an 1820 yellow fever epidemic when Martha was still an infant. Though she never knew her father, she was well acquainted with her uncle, John McPherson Berrien. John Berrien was a United States Senator, renowned orator and jurist, and the namesake of Berrien County in south Georgia. Several accounts describe Martha as sharing her uncle's gifts for elocution and civic engagement.

Martha was related to another of the state's most prominent families through marriage. Her stepfather, General Robert Taylor, was one of Georgia's wealthiest planters, owning estates in Savannah and Morgan County, totaling over 17,000 acres at the time of his death. He built his summer home in Athens, a Greek Revival mansion known as the Taylor-Grady House, now designated as a National Historic Landmark. Martha married her first husband, Hugh O'Keefe Nesbitt, in this home in 1839. Like Martha Berrien's father, Hugh Nesbitt was a physician, though he gave up his practice to manage her considerable plantation holdings in Early County. The couple purchased a home from Judge David Irwin in Marietta in 1852, though Hugh Nesbitt died shortly thereafter. Martha remarried in 1861, to Dr. William Duncan of Savannah. Following his death in 1879, she split her time between the home of her granddaughter in Griffin and her son's Marietta estate, Farm Hill, where she became an influential figure in local social and civic circles.

Robert Taylor Nesbitt (1840-1913) assisted in the management of his family's plantations from an early age, taking on greater responsibility after his father died when he was fifteen. Following his service in the Confederate Army, Colonel Nesbitt married his fiancée, Rebecca Lanier Saffold (1845-1937) in Madison, in 1865. He continued to manage the family holdings in South Georgia until the lingering effects of a bout with diphtheria and the rigors of his military service took their toll. Records indicate that Nesbitt acquired his Marietta property, called Farm Hill, on December 30, 1881, settling there permanently for the benefit of his health. Robert Nesbitt served in the State Senate and as the State Commissioner of Agriculture from 1890 to 1900. He wrote a monthly column, "Mr. Nesbitt's Monthly Talk," in the Marietta Journal, focusing on different crops and agricultural issues. Nesbitt died in 1912, and was buried in the Episcopal Cemetery following a service in the Union Chapel. Rebecca, the daughter of Mary Harris Saffold and William Oliver Saffold, was born in Madison. After donating the land and Chapel to the trustees, Mrs. Nesbitt played the organ in the Chapel. She served as the first president of the Kennesaw Chapter of the Daughters of the Confederacy. She is also buried in the Episcopal Cemetery in Marietta.

As early as 1852, the Nesbitt's were acquainted with another leading Marietta family, the Irwins, who sold them their first property in the area. Judge David Irwin (1807-1885) was a self-taught lawyer, admitted to the state bar at twenty-one before opening a practice in Madison. Irwin moved to Marietta in 1835, eventually accumulating a sizable estate in the area. In addition to serving in the State Senate, Irwin was the first judge elected to the newly created Blue Ridge Judicial Circuit. Despite his lack of formal legal education, Irwin made a significant, lasting impact on Georgia's judicial system, as one of three commissioners appointed to prepare a code of laws for the state. Along with Judges Richard H. Clark and Thomas R.R. Cobb, Irwin produced a comprehensive set of statutes for the state, published in 1861.

=== The original Union Chapel deed ===
These two illustrious Cobb County families came together in 1886, with the formal establishment of the Union Chapel. A deed recorded on December 20, 1886, documents the transfer of a one-acre parcel and building from Robert T. and Rebecca Nesbitt to a group of five trustees: John R. Ward, James G. Hughes, Robert C. Irwin, Robert T. Nesbitt, and Hugh N. Starnes. According to the deed, the Chapel was to "be used as a place of worship for all Christian denominations, for skools [sic] and agricultural societies and for no other purposes." A chapel with an active membership clearly existed on the site prior to 1886, since the deed itself includes transfer of "the building known as Union Chappel [sic]."

=== The first trustees of Union Chapel ===
The Chapel trustees were certainly pillars of the community, though little is known about John R. Ward, James Griffin Hughes was a civil war veteran who fought for the Union, and was later appointed by future president Ulysees S. Grant to oversee the Marietta National cemetery. While no birth or death date is recorded for Hughes, a grave in the Roswell Methodist Cemetery roughly corresponding to the correct period bears the same name. His profession and relation to the other trustees remain unknown. John Ward, the son of Thomas Jefferson Ward and Mary Jane Sorrells, was born in 1831 and served as County Surveyor for many years before his death in 1900. He was married but had no children and was buried at Midway Presbyterian Church Cemetery.

Robert Cessne Irwin (1843-1921) was the son of Judge David Irwin and Sarah Baldwin Royston. He served with the Cobb Mountaineers during the Civil War, rising to the rank of captain. In 1867, he married Mary Wills Lane of Washington, Georgia and they had six children together. Shortly after the War, Irwin was appointed Solicitor General of Cobb County, a position he held until 1891. For the last thirty years of his life, he served as clerk of the State Insurance Department. His funeral service was held at Union Chapel, before interment in the City Cemetery.

Hugh O'Keefe Nesbitt Starnes (1856-1926) was born in Augusta, Georgia, to Ebenezer Nesbitt Starnes and Mary Ann White. He graduated from the University of Georgia in 1875 with a degree in agriculture. In 1880, he married Lucie Berrien McIntosh, a niece of Robert Taylor Nesbitt. After a brief stint as an attorney in Savannah, Starnes relocated to Marietta in 1882 and went to work in the business office of the Atlanta Constitution. He went on to serve as Assistant State School Commissioner and horticulturist at the State Experiment Station in Griffin. In 1898, he joined the faculty of the College of Agriculture at his alma mater. Hugh and Lucie Starnes had four children; both were buried in the Episcopal Cemetery in Marietta.

=== Earlier wooden structure destroyed by fire ===
Anecdotal evidence and oral histories suggest that the original chapel was a wooden structure destroyed by fire. This supposition is supported by several announcements in the Marietta Journal in July and August 1886, marking a fundraising effort for the rebuilding of the chapel. An October 1886 article in The Southern Cultivator and Dixie Farmer provides additional details, stating: "strange to say, at the beginning of this year, the chapel was once more destroyed by fire." The author goes on to celebrate the energetic fundraising of the women in the congregation for the rebuilding effort. In addition, George W. Childs, publisher of the Philadelphia Public Ledger, donated "a most beautiful large Bible" for use in the Chapel.

If the burned structure referred to in The Southern Cultivator was a chapel, it is likely that the Union Chapel existed in some form on the site well before its official endowment in 1886. Several additional facts lead to a conclusion that the 1886 deed merely formalized and gave legal standing to the existing functions of the Chapel and the roles of its leaders. The Chapel trustees are mentioned, though not named, in multiple articles predating the signing of the deed in December 1886. While no records confirm the identity of the earlier trustees, those named in the 1886 deed and members of their families were clearly previously involved with the Chapel. Two fundraising events for the rebuilding of the Chapel were held at the home of Hugh N. Starnes in 1886. Starnes' wife and Rebecca Nesbitt served on the organizing committee for the events, hosted by "the ladies of Union Chapel."

=== Union Chapel and the surrounding community ===
Notices in the local newspapers and church records indicate that the Chapel hosted services regularly, conducted by pastors from around the country. Weddings, funerals, and christenings were also held in the Chapel. Revivals, ice cream socials, and community gatherings took place on the grounds through the first decades of the twentieth century. Some of the significant trustees and members of the congregation during this period were descendants of the Chapel founders.

Mary Anne Irwin (1875- 1963), daughter of Thomas Beverly Irwin and Lilla Atkinson, was Judge David Irwin's granddaughter and niece of original trustee, Robert C. Irwin. Though she inherited a sizable plantation from her mother, Mary Anne's calling lay in education. She sharecropped the Atkinson farm, moved to her father's homeplace on Powder Springs Road, and taught school at Union Chapel for more than thirty years. Miss Irwin also wrote a social column, focused on events in the Union Chapel community, for the Marietta Journal, beginning in 1894. In her later years, she became known as the "Guardian" of the Union Chapel, for her efforts to repair the deteriorating structure and continue its use. An April 1954 article in the Cobb County Times recounted how Miss Irwin salvaged the Chapel bell and her pleas for help from the community to restore the building. Mary Anne Irwin never married and was buried in the cemetery at St. James Episcopal Church in Marietta.

Robert Beverly Irwin, Sr. (1908-1987), was the son of Mary Anne's brother David Atkinson Irwin and Mildred Bishop Goodman. Born in Falls Church, Virginia, Mr. Irwin moved to Georgia as a child, where he spent summers with his family in Marietta. He practiced law in Atlanta for fifty-two years and served as the attorney for the Chapel trustees for many years, vigorously trying to clarify the ownership of the property prior to his death in 1987. He is buried in the Episcopal Cemetery in Marietta.

== Agriculture ==
The Chapel was already a center of agricultural learning and fellowship by the time the deed specified its use for agricultural societies in late 1886. A notice in the Marietta Journal on May 21, 1885, refers to "the grounds of the Phoenix Club, at Union Chapel." The history of the Phoenix Club, in which Hugh N. Starnes served as Secretary, is outlined in the October 1886 issue of The Southern Cultivator and Dixie Farmer. Written by "A. Phoenix," the article states that the club was founded by a group of Marietta farmers in August 1883, in a meeting at Union Chapel. Furthermore, the club drew its name from "the fact that the chapel was erected over the ashes of an antebellum structure."

Organizations like the Phoenix Club played an important role in rural communities during the mid-late Nineteenth Century, as part of a national agricultural reform movement. The first agricultural society in America was established in Philadelphia in 1785, encouraging adoption of new planting and husbandry methods developed in Europe. In 1811, the first American agricultural fair was staged in Pittsfield, Massachusetts, offering prize money for the winning animals and crops. Shortly thereafter, in 1819, the first specialist journal, The American Farmer was created in Baltimore, promoting innovation, experimentation, and new technologies. These events were all manifestations of the impact of the Enlightenment on agriculture in the United States. Beginning in Britain and Europe in the Eighteenth Century, the Enlightenment emphasized scientific examination and discourse and the spread of scientific ideas through societies and publications. This movement had a significant impact on the practice of agriculture and, consequently, its role in society.

Large-scale farming was the mainstay of the economy in the southern United States, including Georgia. The intensive planting of cotton, in particular, on many plantations, to the exclusion of any other crops, resulted in a devastating decline in soil quality. As Georgia planters sought solutions to their dropping productivity, they turned to science and the national agricultural community. The first agricultural society in Georgia was founded in Hancock County in 1837 and the Augusta-based Southern Cultivator journal began circulation in 1843. The agricultural reform movement in the South and more broadly, across the nation, depended on a network of farmers, scientists, and publishers, disseminating information through journals, local meetings, and fairs.

Agriculture clearly underpinned the lives of many of the founders of the Nesbitt/Union Chapel. Martha Berrien Nesbitt Duncan owned enormous acreage in south and middle Georgia, both through her own family and that of her stepfather, General Robert Taylor. Her first husband Hugh O'Keefe Nesbitt, abandoned his medical practice in order to manage her plantations, a job their son, Robert Taylor Nesbitt, an original Chapel trustee, would assume following his father's death. Robert Nesbitt would eventually be elected State Commissioner of Agriculture and author a monthly column on farming issues in the Marietta Journal. Another original trustee, Hugh O'Keefe Nesbitt Starnes, boasted even more impressive credentials in the field of agriculture, graduating with a degree in the subject from the University of Georgia. He was appointed horticulturist at the Griffin Experiment Station in 1892, joined the faculty in the College of Agriculture at his alma mater in 1898, and authored numerous articles and monographs on agricultural subjects.

Starnes, in particular, embodied the spirit of the agricultural societies and reforms in the late Nineteenth Century and the evolution of agricultural science in Georgia. The formal study of agriculture was relatively new in Georgia at the time, having been introduced to the University curriculum in 1872, when the school was designated a federal land-grant institution. Hugh Starnes would thus have been in one of the first full classes to study agriculture at the University. In 1887, the University established the College of Agriculture and Environmental Sciences and, the following year, the Georgia Experiment Station in Griffin, a research facility studying soil erosion and fertilizers. Hugh Starnes would be closely associated with both institutions and the education of future Georgia farmers.

In The Southern Cultivator, "A. Phoenix" notes that in 1886, there were twelve agricultural clubs in Cobb County, prompting the creation of a journal, The Phenix Agriculturalist. According to the article, the Nesbitt/Union Chapel was where "the most intelligent farmers of Cobb county assembled." The proviso in the Nesbitt/Union Chapel deed to include agricultural societies clearly indicates the importance of agricultural education and innovation to the original Trustees.
