= Hill First Baptist Church =

- U.S. Historic district – Contributing property
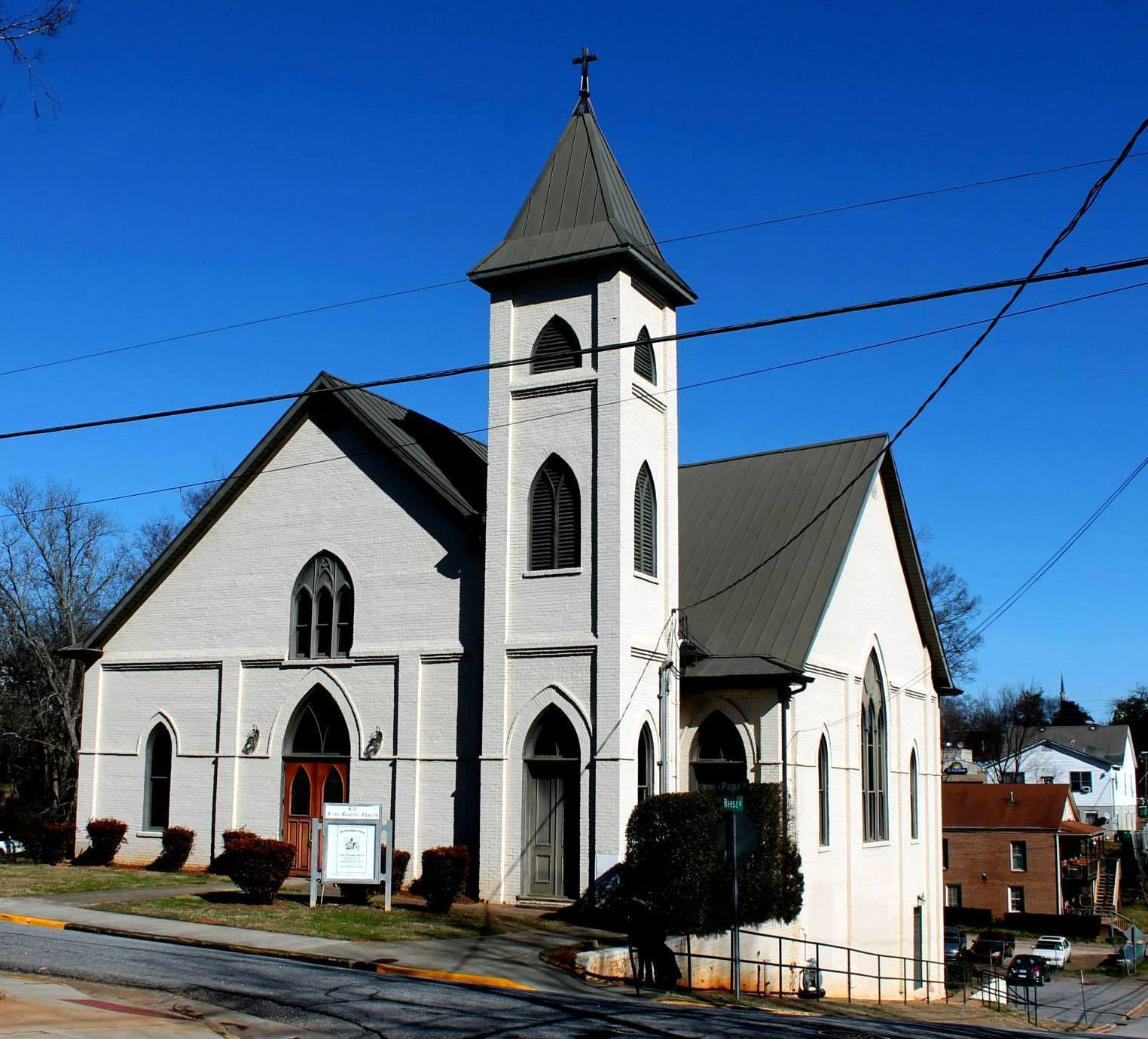
- Location: Athens, Georgia
- Coordinates: 33°57′26″N 83°23′4″W
- Part of: Reese Street Historic District (ID87001990)

Hill First Baptist Church (organized in 1867) "is the oldest African American church in the Athens, Georgia community". It is a contributing property to the Reese Street Historic District.

== See also ==
- National Register of Historic Places listings in Clarke County, Georgia
