= YWCA Building Complex (Athens, Georgia) =

Women's building complex in Georgia

- Young Women's Christian Association Complex
- U.S. National Register of Historic Places
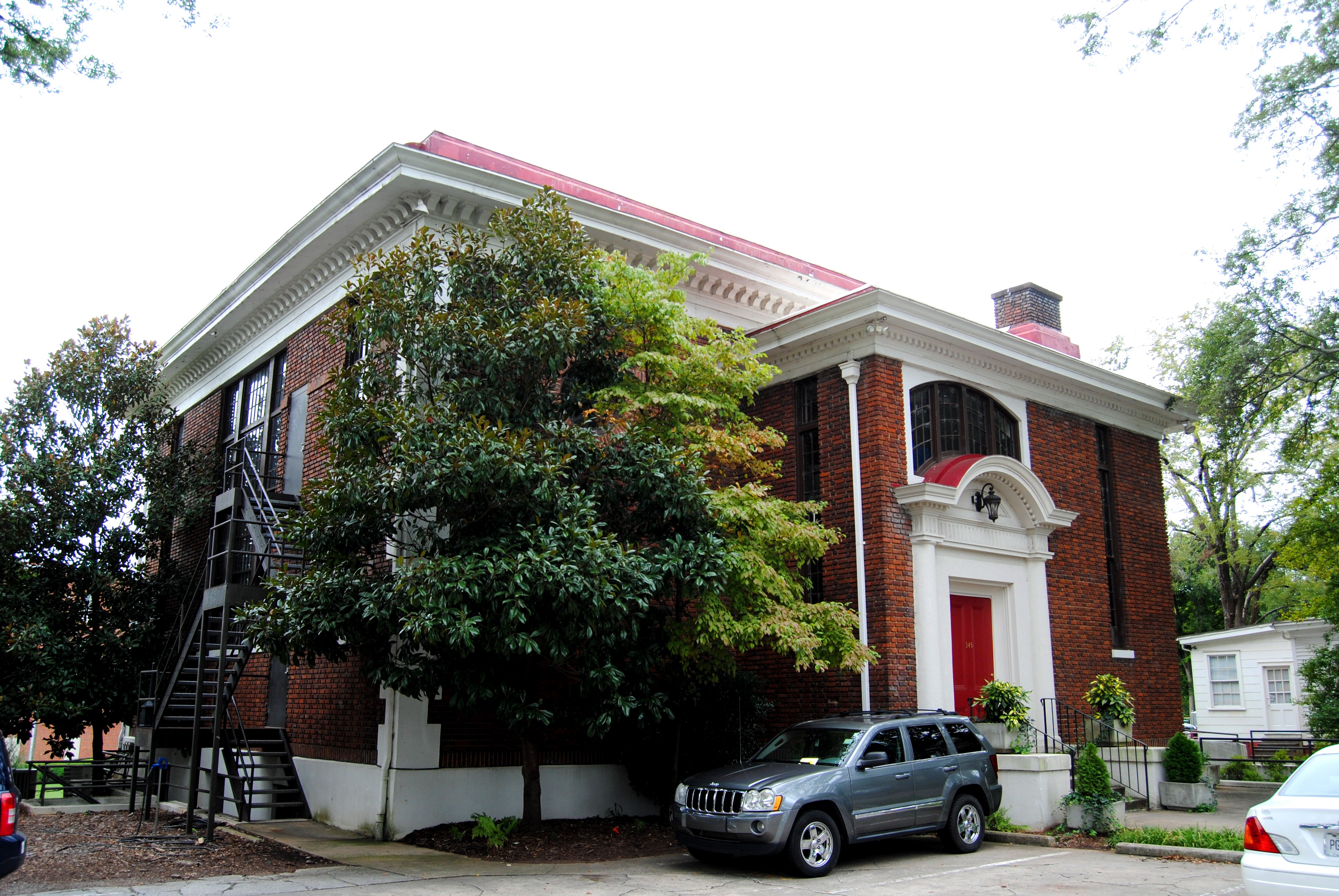
- The 1913 Athletic Building

- Location within Georgia
- Location: 345 & 347 West Hancock Avenue, Athens, Georgia 30601
- Coordinates: 33°57′31″N 83°22′51″W
- Built: 1850, 1913, c. 1930
- Architect: Fred J. Orr
- Architectural style: Greek Revival, Eclectic
- NRHP reference No.: 87000696
- Added to NRHP: May 12, 1987

The YWCA Building Complex is a set of three historic Young Women's Christian Association buildings in Athens, Georgia. They were added to the National Register of Historic Places in 1987 as a single listing, not a historic district.

== History ==
The Athens YWCA was founded in 1906 to provide housing for young women, offer vocational classes, and advocate for their welfare. They purchased the Stephens Thomas House in 1906 and the other two buildings were purpose-built for their needs. The local group disaffiliated from the YWCA USA in 1968 and was renamed at that time to the "Young Women's Christian Organization". The YWCO moved from the site in 1980 when a new facility was built at 562 Research Drive, Athens. It continues today to offer family gym and pool memberships.

== Architecture ==
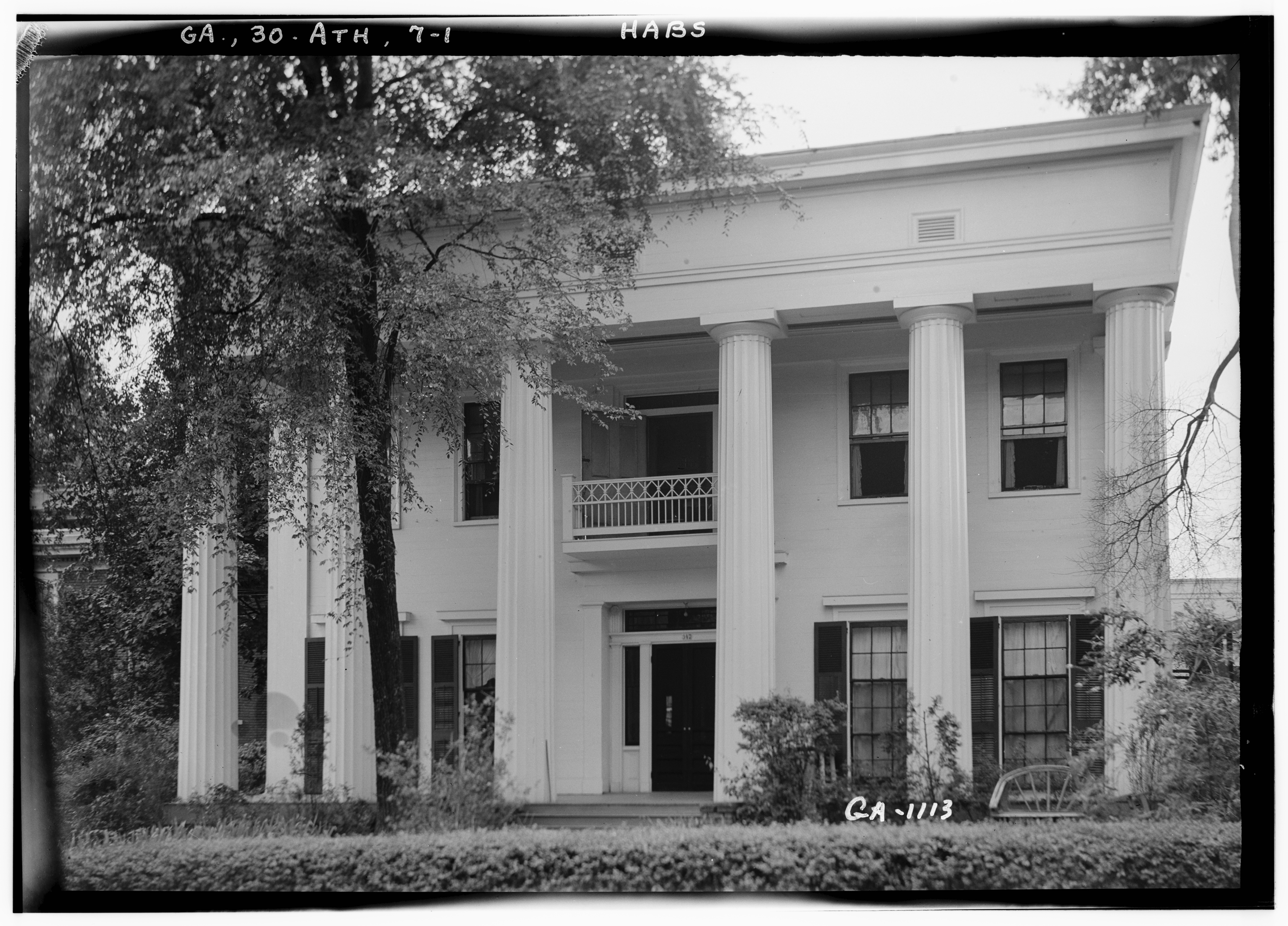
The 1850 Stevens Thomas House

=== Stevens Thomas House ===
Built in 1849 by Stevens Thomas, the Greek Revival house has a monumental front portico. The home was contracted by Washington C. Yoakum, the same contractor as the Howell Cobb House. It was purchased in 1906 and listed in the 1936 Historic American Buildings Survey. The building was owned by Dr. I. H. Goss and operated as the "Everleila Sanitorium" from about 1898 to when the YWCA purchased the home. The Sanitorium provided treatment for Tuberculosis patients and was likely the hub of medical care in Athens at the time.

=== Athletic Building ===
Purpose built as a gymnasium, the two-story brick building containing a pool and used for events. It has an eclectic architectural style designed by prominent Athens architect Fred J. Orr (1874–1935).

=== Servant's House ===
The wood-frame building was built circa 1930 but is no longer in the location.

== See also ==
- Ross Crane House: separately NRHP-listed on the same block
- List of YWCA buildings
- National Register of Historic Places listings in Clarke County, Georgia
