= Robert Taylor Nesbitt =

American politician

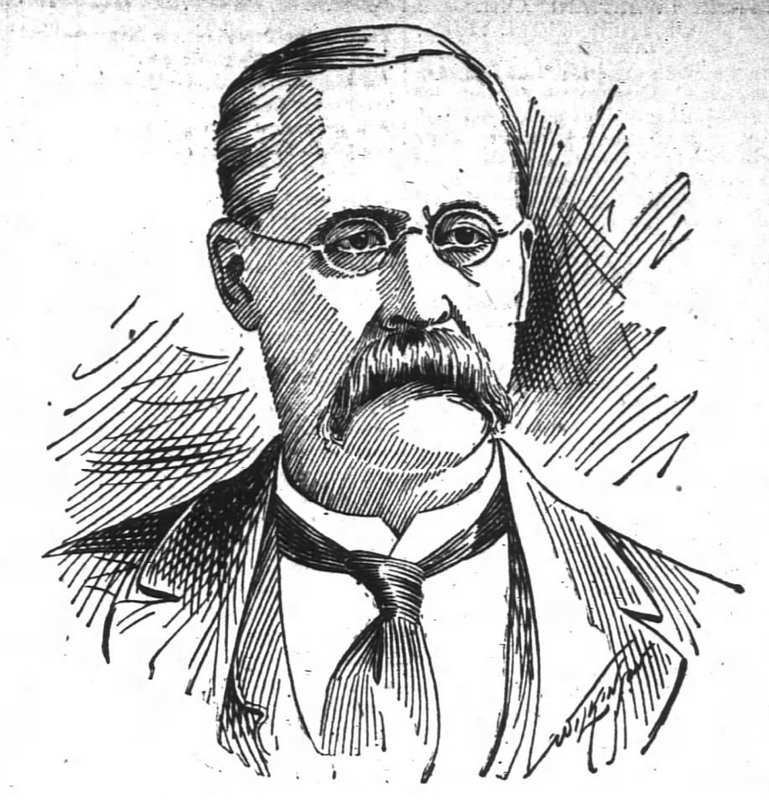

3rd Georgia Commissioner of Agriculture
- In office 1890–1898
- Governor: William J. Northen; William Y. Atkinson
- Preceded by: J. T. Henderson
- Succeeded by: O. B. Stevens

Member of the Georgia State Senate from the 35th district
- In office 1898–1900
- Preceded by: A. C. Blalock
- Succeeded by: Clark Howell

Personal details
- Born: 1843 Savannah, Georgia
- Died: February 13, 1913 (aged 69–70) Cobb County, Georgia
- Spouse: Rebecca Lanier Saffold (m. 1865)
- Occupation: Army officer, politician

Robert Taylor Nesbitt (1843 – February 13, 1913) served as a Georgia State Senator from Cobb County as well as the first elected Georgia Commissioner of Agriculture from 1890–1898.

== Biography ==
Nesbitt was born in Savannah, Georgia, in 1843 to Martha Deloney Berrien Nesbitt Duncan (1820–1896) and Hugh O'Keefe Nesbitt, who were married in 1839. The wedding took place in the Athens, Georgia, home of Martha's Berrian's stepfather, Robert Taylor Grady, a Greek Revival mansion known as the Taylor-Grady Home and now designated as a National Historic Landmark.

Nesbitt was raised in Early County, Georgia, and later lived near Marietta at the Farm Hill estate

In 1865, after four years of service in the Confederate Army, Colonel Nesbitt married Rebecca Lanier Saffold (1845–1937), daughter of Colonel W.O. Saffold, in Madison, Georgia. The Nesbitts eventually settled near Marietta, Georgia, at an estate called Farm Hill, where Robert Nesbitt continued to manage his landholdings in southern Georgia.

Robert Nesbitt wrote a newspaper column, "Mr. Nesbitt's Monthly Talk," for the Marietta Journal, focused on agricultural issues.

In 1886, Robert and Rebecca Nesbitt deeded one acre of land, about three miles outside the city of Marietta, Georgia, for the creation of Union Chapel, to "be used as a place of worship for all Christian denominations, for skools [sic] and agricultural societies and for no other purposes." Along with John R. Ward, James G. Hughes, Robert C. Irwin, and Hugh N. Starnes, Robert Nesbitt served as a trustee for Union Chapel, a stone gothic revival chapel that served as a community gathering place, school, and place of worship for several Christian denominations.

Robert Taylor Nesbitt died at his home on February 13, 1913, and is buried in the St. James Episcopal Cemetery in Marietta, Georgia.
