= James A. Sledge House =

- U.S. National Register of Historic Places
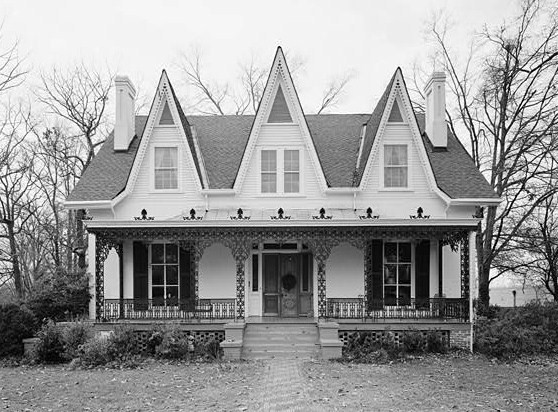
- HABS photo from 1980

- Location within Georgia
- Location: 749 Cobb St., Athens, Georgia
- Coordinates: 33°57′37″N 83°23′49″W
- Area: 1.3 acres (0.53 ha)
- Built: c.1860
- Architectural style: Gothic
- Part of: Cobbham Historic District
- NRHP reference No.: 74000668
- Added to NRHP: February 12, 1974

The James A. Sledge House, at 749 Cobb Street in Athens, Georgia, was built around 1860. Commonly referred to as "The Sledge House", it was listed on the National Register of Historic Places in 1974.

It is a one-and-a-half-story Gothic Revival cottage. Its most salient features are its steep roof and three tall triangular front-facing dormers. It has a one-story veranda across the front of the house. It is built of stuccoed brick walls about 18 inches (0.46 m) thick.

It is also included in the Cobbham Historic District.
