= Wilkins House (Athens, Georgia) =

- U.S. National Register of Historic Places
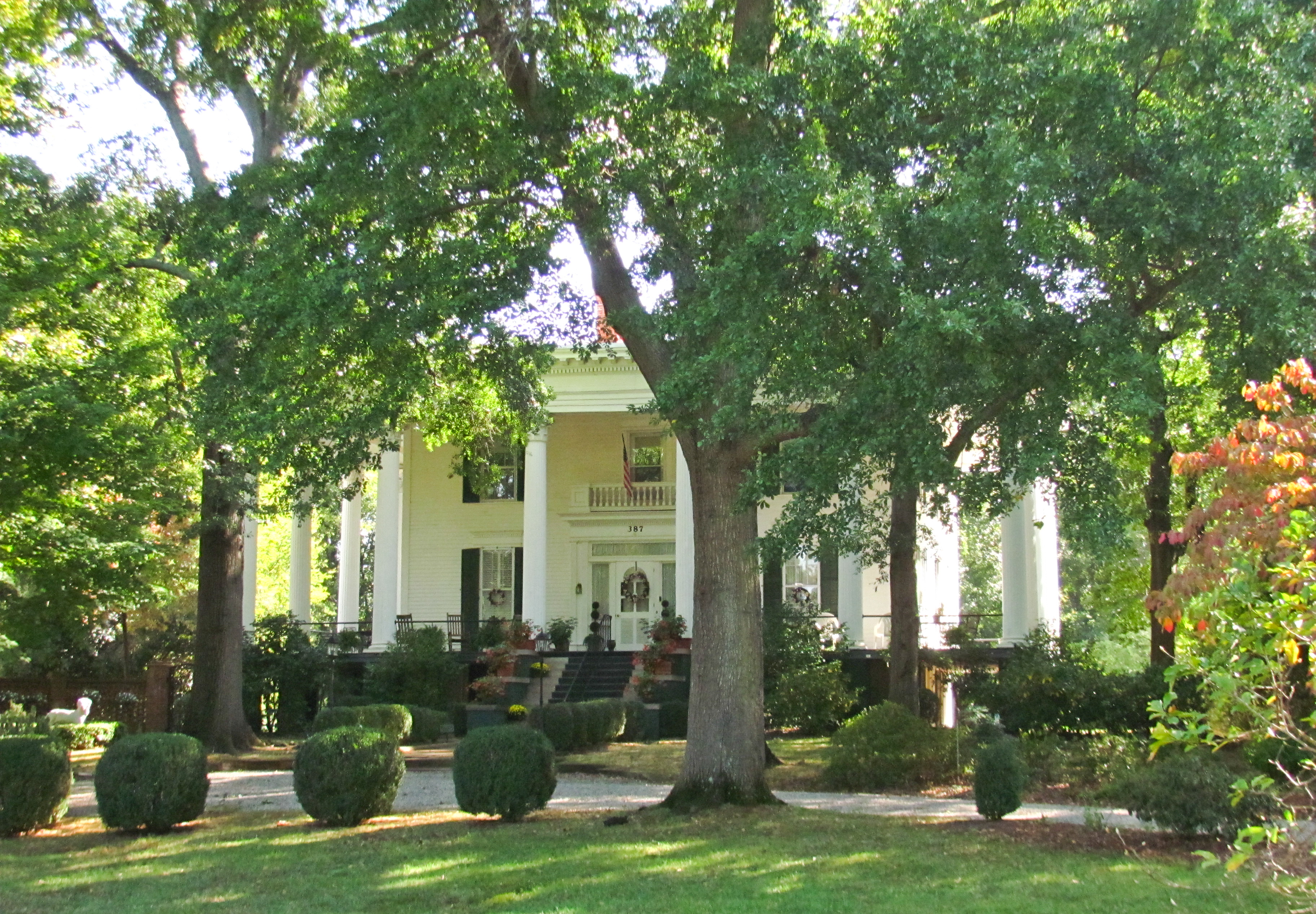

- Location within Georgia
- Location: 387 S. Milledge Ave., Athens, Georgia
- Coordinates: 33°57′04″N 83°23′12″W
- Area: less than one acre
- Built: 1860s
- Architectural style: Classical Revival
- NRHP reference No.: 70000202
- Added to NRHP: May 19, 1970

The Wilkins House, at 387 S. Milledge Ave. in Athens, Georgia, was built in 1860. It was listed on the National Register of Historic Places in 1970.

It is Classical Revival in style. The property was owned by the University of Georgia before 1860, when it was bought by Alfred Dearing. Dearing began construction of the house, which was not completed until after the American Civil War, and sold it in 1878. After passing through several owners, in 1905 John Julian Wilkins and his wife purchased the house for $10,000. Wilkins was president of the Georgia National Bank and of the American State Bank, and was "the leading banker in Athens and one of the South's most important financial figures."

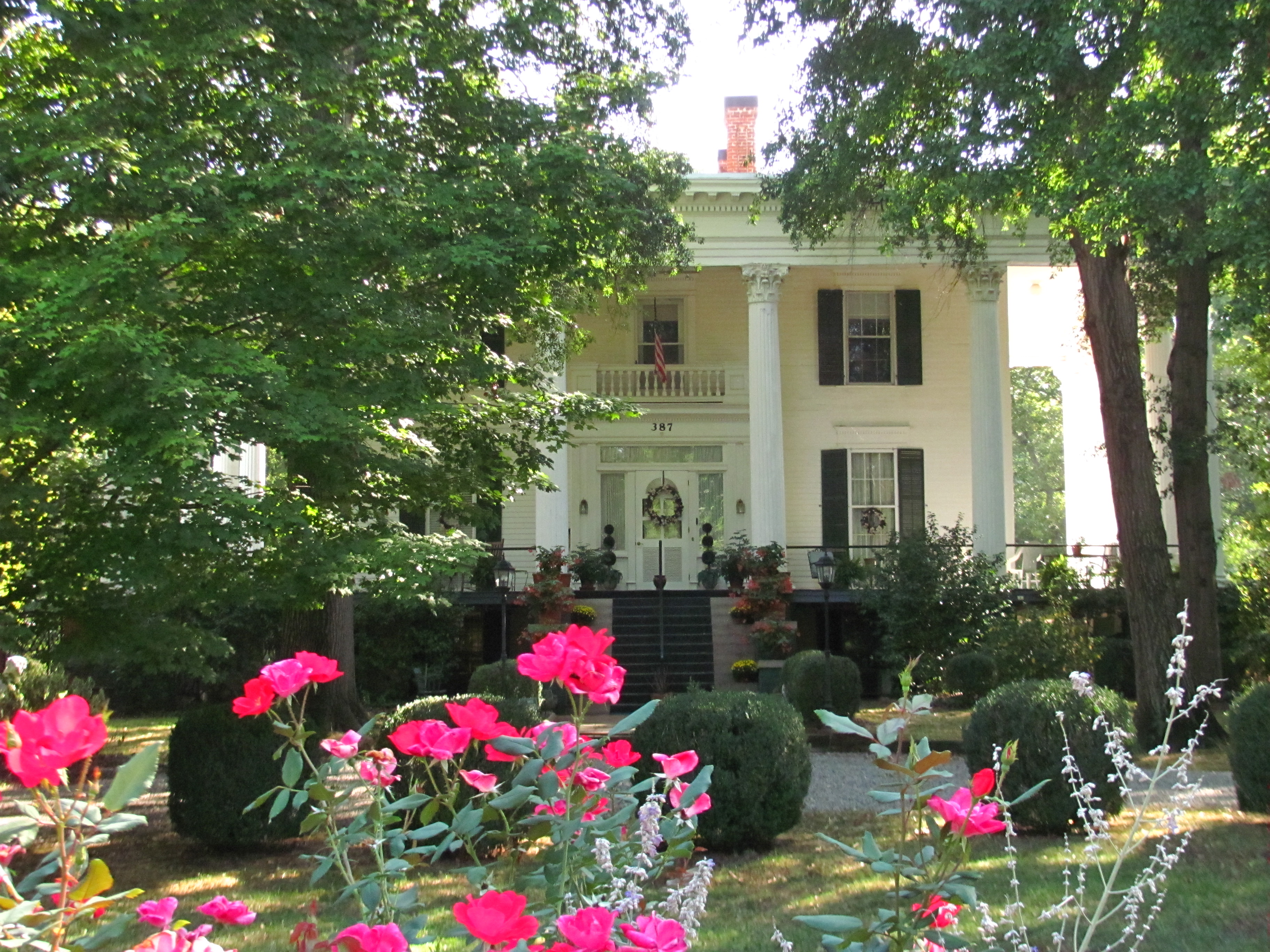

The house has a "large cast iron dog guarding the grounds".
