= Cobbham Historic District =

Historic district in Georgia, United States

- U.S. National Register of Historic Places
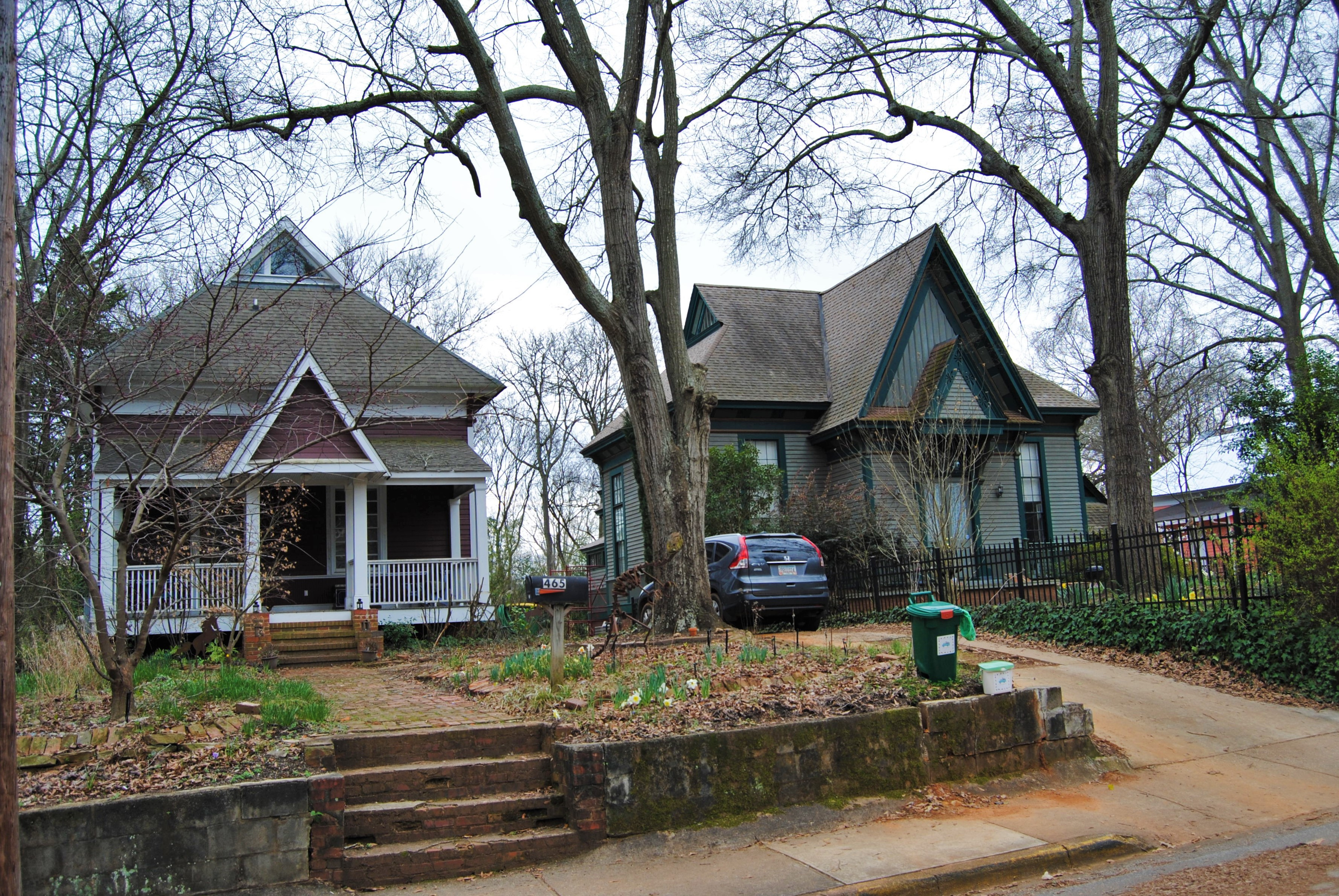

- Location within Georgia
- Location: Roughly bounded by Prince Ave., Hill, Reese, and Pope Sts., Athens, Georgia
- Coordinates: 33°57′32″N 83°23′31″W
- Area: 117 acres (0.47 km^{2})
- Built: c. 1834
- Developer: John Cobb
- Architectural style: Greek Revival, Late Victorian, Gothic Revival
- NRHP reference No.: 78000973
- Added to NRHP: August 24, 1978

The Cobbham Historic District, in Athens, Georgia, is a historic district which was listed on the National Register of Historic Places in 1978. It included 216 contributing buildings on 117 acres (0.47 km^{2}).

The district is roughly bounded by Prince Ave., Hill, Reese, and Pope Streets. It includes Greek Revival, Gothic Revival, and Late Victorian.

It includes:

- Fire Station #2
- James A. Sledge House, a Gothic Revival cottage which is separately listed on the National Register.
- Seney–Stovall Chapel, separately listed
