= Oconee Street School =

- U.S. National Register of Historic Places
- Location within Georgia
- Location: 199 W. Washington St., Athens, Georgia
- Coordinates: 33°57′09″N 83°21′59″W
- Built: 1908
- NRHP reference No.: 100003284
- Added to NRHP: December 31, 2018

The Oconee Street School, at 594 Oconee St in Athens, Georgia was built in 1908. It was listed on the National Register of Historic Places in 2018.

It is a masonry building.

It was used as a school until around 1971.

In 2017, there were plans for it to be converted into 16 apartments.
