= Henry W. Grady House =

- U.S. National Register of Historic Places
- U.S. National Historic Landmark
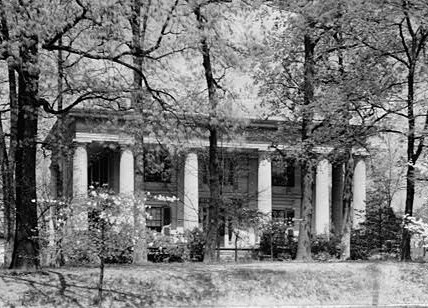

- Location within Georgia Location within the United States
- Location: 634 Prince Ave., Athens, Georgia
- Coordinates: 33.96167°N 83.38827°W
- Area: 3.5 acres (14,000 m^{2})
- Built: 1840s
- Architect: Robert Taylor
- Architectural style: Greek Revival
- NRHP reference No.: 76000613

Significant dates
- Added to NRHP: May 11, 1976
- Designated NHL: May 11, 1976

The Taylor-Grady House, also known as the Henry W. Grady House, is a historic house museum and National Historic Landmark at 634 Prince Avenue in Athens, Georgia, United States. Built in the 1840s, this Greek Revival house is notable as the only known surviving home of Henry W. Grady (1850–89), managing editor of the Atlanta Constitution and a leading force in the reintegration of the American South in the Reconstruction Era that followed the American Civil War. The house is operated by the Junior League of Athens, which offers tours and rentals for private events.

== Description and history ==
The Taylor-Grady House is located in central Athens, at the northwest corner of Prince and Grady Avenues, set on a generously sized landscaped lot. It is a rectangular two-story wood-frame structure, with a hip roof that is obscured by a parapet-like entablature that wraps around three sides. The roof extends beyond the main bulk of the house on those three sides to form a gallery, which is supported by thirteen massive fluted Doric columns. The building interior follows a center-hall plan, and retains a significant amount of interior finishes, including woodwork, plaster, and fireplace mantels.

The house was built in the mid-1840s for General Robert Taylor, an Irish immigrant, plantation owner, and leader of the state militia. In 1863 the house was purchased by William S. Grady, who lived here with his family until 1872. Grady's son Henry was at that time a child, but harbored fond memories of the house. Grady achieved national prominence as the managing editor of the Atlanta Constitution, which became a major regional newspaper during his tenure. In 1886, he gave a widely reprinted speech urging harmonious relations between northern and southern states, and encouraging northern investment to industrialize the South. Grady is sometimes credited with promoting the phrase "New South" as a way to express these notions about the South.

The house was purchased by the City of Athens in 1966, and was declared a National Historic Landmark in 1976. The Junior League of Athens maintains the house, which is open for rental for special occasions and for tours.

== See also ==
- List of National Historic Landmarks in Georgia (U.S. state)
- National Register of Historic Places listings in Clarke County, Georgia
