= Washington State Route 243 =

State highway in Grant County, Washington

State Route 243
- A map of Grant County with SR 243 highlighted in red

Route information
- Auxiliary route of SR 24
- Maintained by WSDOT
- Length: 28.23 mi (45.43 km)
- Existed: 1964–present

Major junctions
- South end: SR 24 near Desert Aire
- North end: SR 26 near Vantage

Location
- Country: United States
- State: Washington
- Counties: Grant

Highway system
- State highways in Washington; Interstate; US; State; Scenic; Pre-1964; 1964 renumbering; Former
← SR 241	→ SR 260

State Route 243 (SR 243) is a state highway in Grant County, Washington. It travels north–south along the Columbia River for 28 miles (45 km), connecting SR 24 at the Vernita Bridge to SR 26 near Vantage. The highway travels through a predominantly rural and desert area, serving two hydroelectric dams and the communities of Desert Aire, Mattawa, and Beverly.

The highway was established as a branch of Secondary State Highway 7C (SSH 7C) in 1957, to be built uphill from the reservoir of the new Priest Rapids Dam. Construction was completed in the early 1960s and it was re-designated as SR 243 during the 1964 state highway renumbering.

== Route description ==
SR 243 begins at a junction with SR 24 at the north end of the Vernita Bridge, located in the Hanford Reach National Monument. Traffic continuing on SR 24 towards Othello is forced to turn east, while the highway continues northwest as SR 243. The highway turns west and follows the Columbia River upstream, passing a public boat launch and a campground within the Saddle Mountain National Wildlife Refuge. As the terrain transitions from brushland and sand dunes to irrigated farmland, SR 243 turns northwest and passes the Priest Rapids Dam and Wanapum Heritage Center at the south end of Desert Aire, a resort town with its own golf course and public airport.

The highway continues north through the vineyards of the western Wahluke Slope and passes a roundabout at the west end of Mattawa. North of Mattawa, the bluffs of the Saddle Mountains cause the river and its valley to narrow, leaving SR 243 to run directly on the eastern bank as it traverses the Sentinel Gap. Near Beverly, the highway passes under the Beverly Railroad Bridge, which carries the Palouse to Cascades State Park Trail, and moves away from the river bank to serve Wanapum Village near the Wanapum Dam. SR 243 continues north across the hills overlooking the dam's reservoir, passing through several rock cuts near the Sand Hollow Recreation Area, and descends to an intersection with SR 26, where the highway terminates. The junction is located one mile (1.6 km) south of an interchange with Interstate 90 (I-90) at the east end of the Vantage Bridge, where SR 26 itself terminates.

The highway is maintained by the Washington State Department of Transportation (WSDOT), which conducts an annual survey of traffic volume on state routes, expressed in terms of annual average daily traffic. Average vehicle counts on SR 243 measured in 2016 ranged from a minimum of 2,800 vehicles near Beverly to a maximum of 4,600 vehicles between Desert Aire and Mattawa.

== History ==
A road following the un-dammed Columbia River from the Priest Rapids to Vantage was built by the early 1910s, roughly along the path of modern SR 243. The state legislature authorized construction of a new state highway between Vantage and the Vernita ferry in 1957 and designated it as a branch of Secondary State Highway 7C (SSH 7C). The highway was created to serve the under-construction Priest Rapids and Wanapum dams, the former of which would inundate a section of the old road with its new reservoir. Construction on the highway began later in the year and was completed in the early 1960s, shortly before the opening of the Vernita Bridge at its southern terminus with SSH 11A. During 1964 state highway renumbering, the Priest Rapids branch of SSH 7C was re-designated as SR 243, while the main route became SR 26.

The intersection with Road 24, a county road that serves as the main entry to Mattawa, had been the site of several major and fatal collisions in the late 2000s, prompting WSDOT to propose construction of a roundabout. The $1.25 million roundabout was the first to be built in a rural area and was subject to opposition from local residents. After it was completed in 2014, the opposing residents apologized for their stance on the project, having adjusted to the change.

== Major intersections ==
The entire route is in Grant County.

Location	mi	km	Destinations	Notes
	0.00	0.00	SR 24 – Yakima, Richland, Othello	
	28.23	45.43	SR 26 to I-90 – Vantage, Royal City	
1.000 mi = 1.609 km; 1.000 km = 0.621 mi
