= Washington State Route 24 =

State highway in south-central Washington, US

State Route 24
- Map of the Mid-Columbia region with SR 24 highlighted in red

Route information
- Maintained by WSDOT
- Length: 79.23 mi (127.51 km)
- Existed: 1964–present

Major junctions
- West end: I-82 / US 12 / US 97 in Yakima
- SR 240 near Vernita Bridge; SR 243 near Vernita Bridge
- East end: SR 26 in Othello

Location
- Country: United States
- State: Washington
- Counties: Yakima, Benton, Grant, Adams

Highway system
- State highways in Washington; Interstate; US; State; Scenic; Pre-1964; 1964 renumbering; Former
← SR 23	→ SR 25

State Route 24 (SR 24) is a state highway in the south-central region of Washington, in the United States. It travels 79 miles (127 km) from Yakima to Othello, across a portion of the Columbia Plateau. The highway crosses the Columbia River on the Vernita Bridge, located near the Hanford Site. SR 24 terminates to the west at an interchange with Interstate 82 (I-82) in Yakima and to the east at SR 26 in Othello.

The highway was added to the state highway system in 1937 as Secondary State Highway 11A (SSH 11A), composed of several county-built gravel roads from Yakima to Connell, with a ferry crossing at Hanford. The Hanford section of SSH 11A was closed in 1943 due to wartime activities at the Hanford Nuclear Reservation, forcing the state government to relocate the highway to the north side of the Columbia River. The new highway opened in 1961 and was supplanted by the new Vernita toll bridge in 1965. During the 1964 state highway renumbering, SR 24 replaced most of SSH 11A and was rerouted to a terminus in Othello.

== Route description ==
SR 24 begins in eastern Yakima as an extension of Nob Hill Boulevard at a diamond interchange with I-82 and the concurrent US 12 and US 97. The interchange is located southeast of the Central Washington State Fairgrounds and the SunDome arena. SR 24 travels southeasterly from the interchange as a four-lane divided highway and crosses the Yakima River into unincorporated Yakima County near Yakima Sportsman State Park. The highway narrows to two lanes and continues southeast along the Central Washington Railroad, a branch of the BNSF Railway, changing course to bypass the city of Moxee on its south side. SR 24 continues beyond the railroad's terminus and runs deeper into the Moxee Valley, an irrigated area situated between the Yakima Ridge and Yakima Training Center to the north and the Rattlesnake Hills to the south.

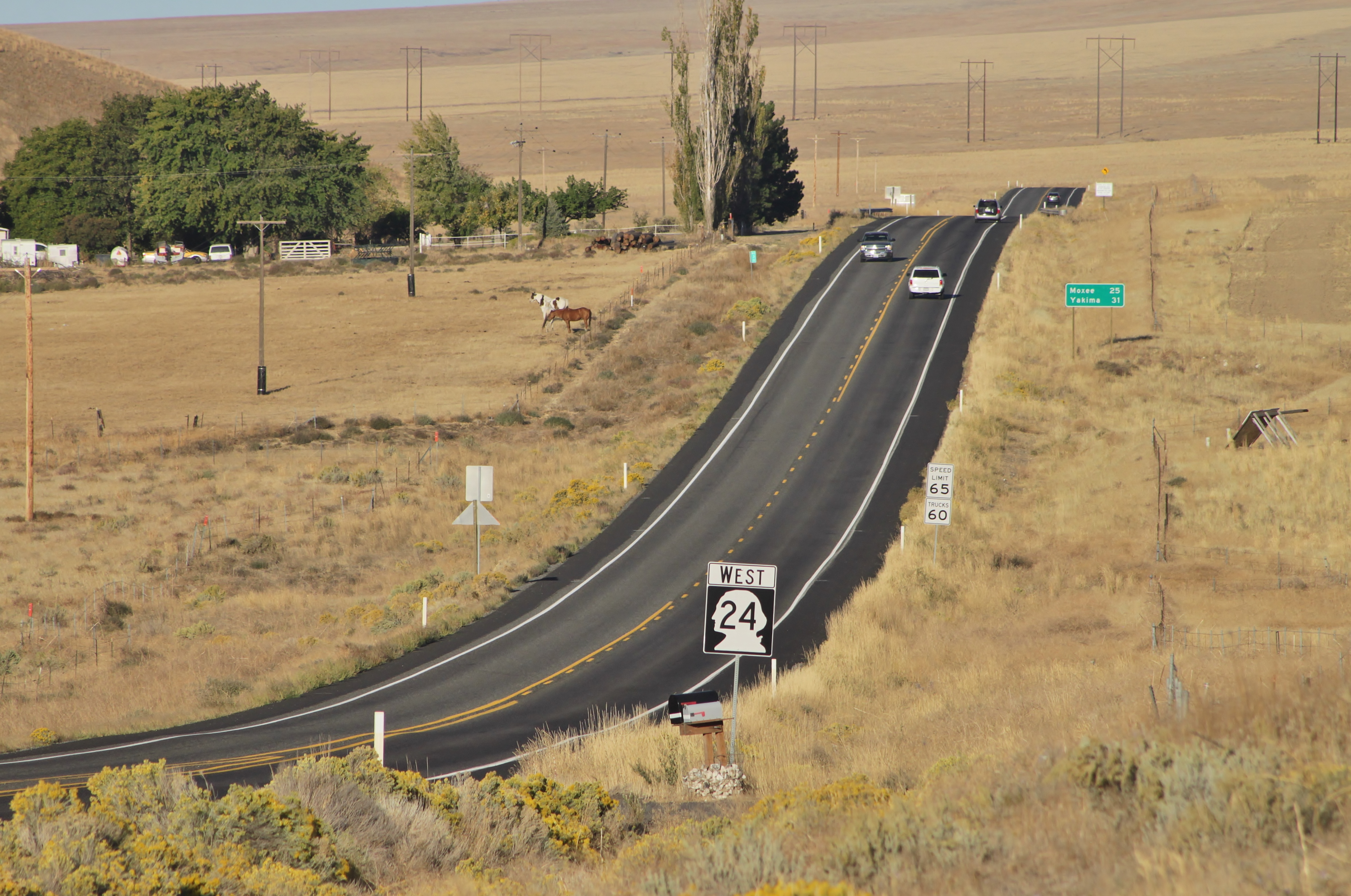
Looking westbound on SR 24 at its junction with SR 241 at the Yakima–Benton county line

At the east end of the valley, SR 24 turns northeast and crosses through a narrow pass in the hills before reaching the Black Rock Valley, which it continues across. Midway through the valley at the Silver Dollar Cafe, the highway intersects SR 241, an auxiliary route that travels south towards Sunnyside. SR 24 continues northeast from the junction and enters Benton County, where it climbs a section of the Yakima Ridge and exits the valley. The highway crosses part of the Fitzner–Eberhardt Arid Lands Ecology Reserve, a restricted wildlife preserve that forms part of the Hanford Reach National Monument. SR 24 meets SR 240, a major highway connecting to the Tri-Cities, at the northeast corner of the reserve. SR 24 turns north at the junction and travels along the northwest edge of the Hanford Site, flanked by fences on both sides of the road. The highway descends from the plateau by turning west and returning to its northerly course, eventually reaching a rest area on the south shore of the Columbia River.

SR 24 crosses the Columbia River on the Vernita Bridge, a 1,982-foot-long (604 m) steel truss bridge downriver from the Priest Rapids Dam. On the north side of the bridge in Grant County, the highway intersects SR 243, which travels along the Columbia River towards Mattawa and Vantage. SR 23 turns northeast and follows the south wall of the Wahluke Slope before traveling due east across the Saddle Mountain National Wildlife Refuge and into Adams County. The highway leaves the Hanford Reach National Monument and forms the boundary between Adams and Franklin counties for several miles, briefly turning to cross a section of the Saddle Mountains. Near the former Othello Air Force Station, SR 24 turns north and follows Radar Road through farmland on the outskirts of Othello. After entering Othello, the highway becomes Broadway Avenue and continues through an industrial area before terminating at an underpass with SR 26. The two highways are connected via an extension of 1st Avenue on both sides of the underpass.

SR 24 is maintained by the Washington State Department of Transportation (WSDOT), which conducts an annual survey on the state's highways to measure traffic volume in terms of annual average daily traffic. The busiest section of the highway, at its interchange with I-82, carried a daily average of 23,000 vehicles in 2016; the least busiest section of the highway, northeast of the Vernita Bridge, carried only 1,100 vehicles. A short section between I-82 and Faucher Road in Moxee is designated as a MAP-21 arterial under the National Highway System, a network of roads identified as important to the national economy, defense, and mobility.

== History ==
SR 24 was added to Washington's state highway system in 1937 as Secondary State Highway 11A (SSH 11A), which traveled from Primary State Highway 3 (PSH 3) and US 410 in Yakima to PSH 11 and US 395 in Connell. The highway was preceded by several unpaved roads built by county governments along the corridor by the 1910s, including a road across the Moxee and Black Rock valleys, a ferry across the Columbia River at White Bluffs, and a road continuing to Connell, bypassing Othello.

The state government did not improve the gravel county roads that encompassed SSH 11A, but did relocate its toll-free ferry from White Bluffs to Hanford in May 1938. The Hanford ferry was initially planned to use a cable-operated system, but costs forced it to be downgraded to a tug-and-barge ferry. During World War II, the U.S. military selected the Hanford area as the site of a major weapons development facility and a section of SSH 11A was acquired via a request of the Secretary of War filed on July 21, 1943. The 28-mile (45 km) section, located between Cold Creek and Hanford, was closed permanently to non-military traffic on November 15, 1943, and divided SSH 11A into two disconnected highways. The rest of the highway had been paved by the state government in the early 1940s, with the exception of a section west of Connell that remained gravel.

SSH 11A was relocated in 1953 to a crossing of the Columbia River north of Cold Creek at Vernita and would continue along a new highway along the Columbia River to the east end of the former Hanford ferry. The state government had initially expected the highway to re-open after the war, but continued use of Hanford for weapons and energy development prompted them to file a lawsuit against the federal government to seek reimbursement to fund construction of the new highway around the site. The U.S. District Court's decision to award only $1 in nominal damages in 1952 was upheld by a decision of the Ninth Circuit Court of Appeals two years later, citing the state's delay in identifying a suitable alternate route. In response, Representative Donald H. Magnuson introduced a Congressional bill to reimburse $581,721 to the state (equivalent to $4.95 million in 2024 dollars), but it was vetoed by President Dwight D. Eisenhower in September 1957.

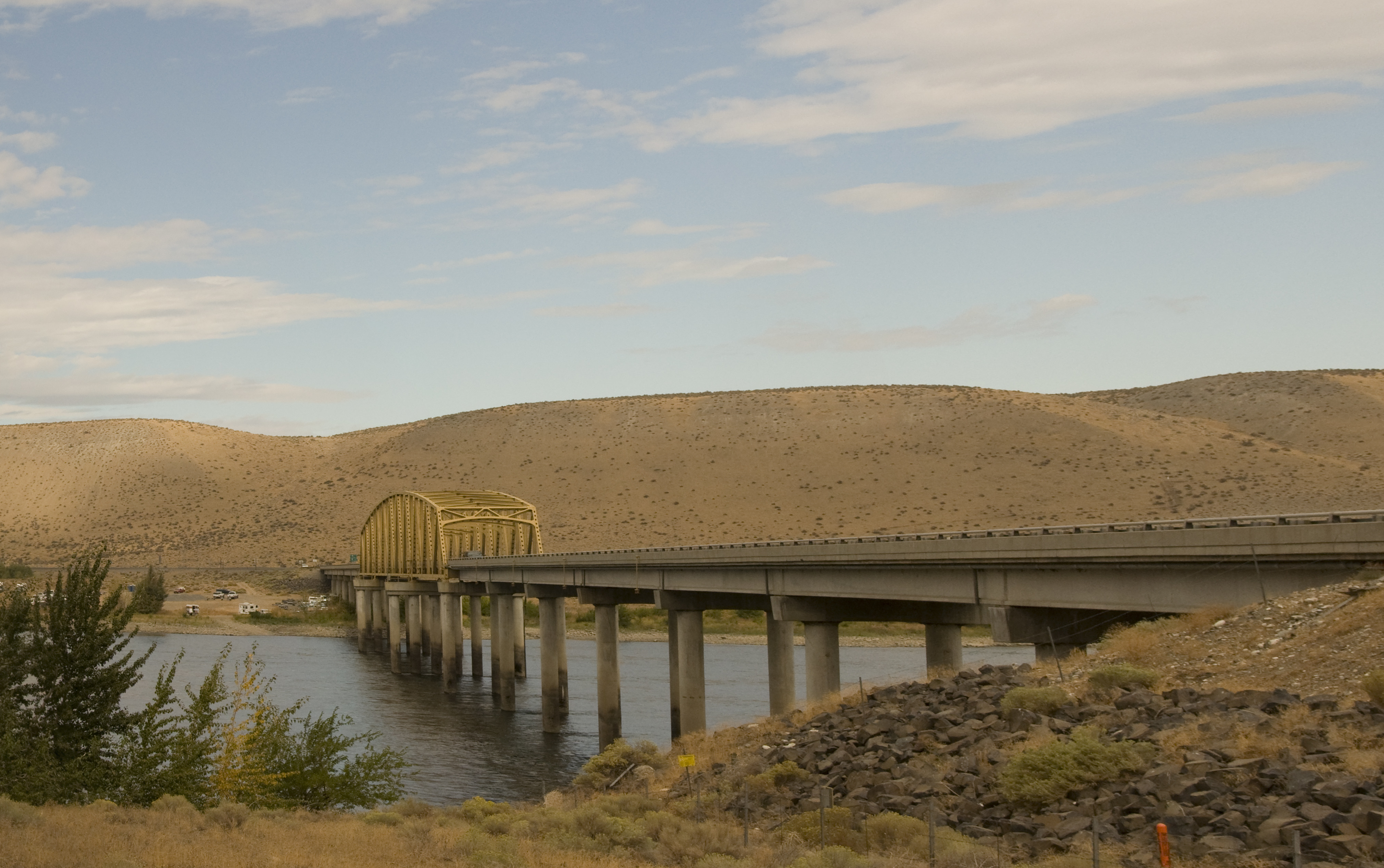
The Vernita Bridge, built in 1965 to carry the newly-relocated SR 24

From January 1954 to December 1955, Army Corps of Engineers constructed a dirt road on the north side of the Columbia River between Vernita and White Bluffs, passing through a less-restricted portion of the Hanford Site. The road was built as part of an agreement between the state and federal governments that was negotiated during the lawsuit, as an alternative to re-opening SSH 11A across the Hanford restricted zone. A private toll ferry connecting SSH 11A at Vernita to SSH 7C on the north side of the river began operating in November 1957 and was taken over by the state in May 1961. The state government completed construction of the paved 8.3-mile (13.4 km) highway along the Wahluke Slope on May 19, 1961, extending SSH 11A to a junction with SSH 11G south of Othello. As part of the agreement with the federal Atomic Energy Commission, the highway was ringed by fences and signs prohibiting parking and loitering, as well as controlled traffic signals that would allow for a large-scale evacuation of the Hanford area. The west end of SSH 11A was truncated to the newly-opened Yakima bypass (part of I-82) in November 1963.

The Vernita Bridge began construction in October 1964 and was opened to traffic on October 1, 1965, replacing the state-run ferry. The bridge was funded using $3 million in bonds (equivalent to $22.7 million in 2024 dollars) that were paid off using a toll of 75 cents to $2.50 collected until 1977. During the 1964 state highway renumbering, SSH 11A was divided between three new state highways under the sign route system: State Route 24 (SR 24) from Yakima to the junction with SSH 11G (now SR 17), SR 170 from Ringold on the Columbia River to Mesa, and SR 260 between Mesa and Connell. The Ringold section of SR 170 was later transferred to Franklin County in 1967, per a clause in a 1963 highway bill that was triggered by the completion of SR 240. SR 24 was formally codified in 1970, with its eastern terminus changed to a junction with SR 26 south of downtown Othello. The Othello link was built by the end of the decade, effectively completing all of SR 24.

Congestion on a two-mile (3.2 km) section of SR 24 between I-82 and the east side of the Yakima River had worsened by the late 1990s and prompted the state government to consider a $35 million replacement and expansion project. The project was combined with a floodplain restoration plan proposed by the county government in response to a major flood in 1996 and originally considered building a second bridge upriver and realigning the highway. A revised plan placing the higher replacement bridge next to the existing crossing, saving costs and environmental mitigation for 7 acres (2.8 ha) of wetlands, was adopted in 2002 and funded by the legislature's 2003 Nickel Program gas tax. Construction on the new bridge and the widened four-lane highway began in May 2005 and was dedicated on June 28, 2007, costing a total of $54.5 million. In 2008, the state government also built a series of passing lanes along SR 24 between Silver Dollar and Cold Creek in response to increased truck traffic.

== Major intersections ==
County	Location	mi	km	Destinations	Notes
Yakima	Yakima	0.00	0.00	I-82 / US 12 / US 97 – Richland, Ellensburg	Interchange
Yakima		30.40	48.92	SR 241 south – Sunnyside	
Benton		38.43	61.85	SR 240 east – Richland	
Columbia River		43.32– 43.70	69.72– 70.33	Vernita Bridge	
Grant		43.85	70.57	SR 243 north – Vantage	
Adams	Othello	79.23	127.51	SR 26 (via South 1st Avenue) – Vantage, Moses Lake, Ephrata	
1.000 mi = 1.609 km; 1.000 km = 0.621 mi

== See also ==
- List of state routes in Washington
- Death of David Glenn Lewis, Texas man killed in accident on Route 24 in Moxee; not identified for 11 years
