= Range 12 Fire =

2016 fire in Washington state

- The Range 12 Fire burning throughout the Yakima River Valley
- Date: July 30 – August 6, 2016; (8 days)
- Location: Benton County and; Yakima County, Washington, United States
- Coordinates: 46.587°N 119.977°W

Statistics
- Burned area: 176,600 acres (71,500 ha; 275.9 sq mi)

Impacts
- Cost: $1.7 million (equivalent to $2.3 million in 2025)

Ignition
- Cause: Live fire exercise

Map
- Location within Washington (state) Location within the United States

The Range 12 Fire was a large wildfire that burned 176,600 acres (71,500 ha) in Benton and Yakima County, Washington, United States, from July 30 to August 8, 2016. No injuries or fatalities resulted from the fire, and no building damage was reported. The fire threatened the Hanford Nuclear Reservation and burnt parts of the Hanford Reach National Monument and the Arid Lands Ecology Reserve, the third time in sixteen years. Over 400 personnel from various federal, state, and local agencies and organizations responded to contain and extinguish the fire, which costed $1.7 million (equivalent to $2.3 million in 2025).

The fire was caused by a round of ammunition from machine gun fire that ricocheted and landed on brush at the Yakima Training Center during a live fire exercise. Hot, dry, and windy conditions in the area caused the fire to spread rapidly through grassland throughout the first four days until it was primarily contained on August 2. Following the fire in 2018, a $15 million lawsuit was filed by ranchers in the area whose property was damaged by the fire against the Department of Defense directed at personnel working at the Yakima Training Center, claiming that their fire response was inadequate. The lawsuit was later dismissed in 2022 after the court concluded it did not have the jurisdiction to handle the case.

== Background ==
Wildfires are a natural part of the ecological cycle of the Northwestern United States, but human-induced climate change has caused them to increase in number, destructiveness, duration, and frequency. Fire suppression efforts can also have the contradictory effect of worsening the effects of fires that do occur. The Range 12 Fire was one of 1,272 wildfires that burned 293,717 acres (118,863 ha) in Washington in 2016. The National Interagency Fire Center predicted a typical wildfire season for the state of Washington. Despite an early start, the 2016 season was milder in both total wildfires and acreage burned compared to the 2015 wildfire season.

Before the fire, the Hanford Reach National Monument and surrounding regions were in the process of recovering from two previous wildfires, the 24 Command Fire in 2000 and the Overlook Fire in 2007. The 24 Command Fire spread across all 77,000 acres (31,000 ha) of the Arid Lands Ecology Reserve and part of the Hanford Reach National Monument which included Rattlesnake Mountain, the boundary of the Hanford Nuclear Reservation. It also burnt down 11 homes in Benton City. Following the 24 Command Fire, $6 million was spent on restoring the Hanford Reach National Monument, which included planting local sagebrushes such as the Wyoming big sagebrush and the threetip sagebrush. The Overlook Fire burned around 55,000 acres (22,000 ha) of the Reserve but did not threaten the Hanford Nuclear Reservation. The area affected by both wildfires was still in the process of regrowth before the Range 12 Fire.

On July 29, 2016, a day before the fire, the National Weather Service in Pendleton, Oregon had issued a red flag warning for high wind gusts and low relative humidity in the area. On the same day, the Yakima Training Center had already put out multiple fires related to live fire exercises. Weather in the Tri-Cities region was forecasted to have high temperatures of 95 °F (35 °C), southwesterly winds of 10–15 miles per hour (16–24 km/h), and a relative humidity around 20 percent throughout the day.

== Incident ==
At approximately 4:40 pm (PST), July 30, 2016, during a live fire exercise at the Yakima Training Center, a tracer round from machine gun fire had ricocheted and landed on brush, igniting the fire.

In a span of seven hours, the fire had spread to more than 15,000 acres (6,100 ha) and had crossed Washington State Route 24. The winds the following morning were blowing at 15–20 miles per hour (24–32 km/h), causing the fire to spread rapidly. Although the winds had died down during the evening, the fire had already rapidly spread to 60,000 acres (24,000 ha) acres. Washington State Route 225 was closed at the intersections of River Road and Acord Road near Benton City, and at Washington State Route 240. State Route 24 was also closed at milepost 8.5 west towards the intersection with Washington State Route 241.

The following day, firefighters attempted to set a backburn on top of Rattlesnake Mountain to prevent the wildfire from spreading towards the Hanford Nuclear Reservation and Benton City, but was abandoned due to dangerous windy conditions, which caused the wildfire to rapidly spread towards the backburn location. At around 9:00 pm, the firefighters attempted to set another backburn on Rattlesnake Mountain towards the bottom slope, which was successful on their second attempt. By August 2, the fire had expanded 100,000 acres (40,000 ha), from 70,000 acres (28,000 ha) to 176,000 acres (71,000 ha). Another red flag warning was issued for areas around the Columbia River in southern Washington the same day due to gusty winds and low relative humidity caused by a dry cold front moving throughout the area. By the end of the day, containment was listed at 20 percent.

The next day, containment was listed at 60 percent with 228 firefighters assigned to the fire. Firefighters continued working on reinforcing containment lines around the 117-mile perimeter of the fire, which had largely stopped expanding because of natural features close to the perimeter of the fire that prevented spread along with the first containment lines. On August 4, containment was listed at 90 percent with approximately 170 firefighters assigned. Firefighters worked on putting out hot spots within the fire's burned area, one of which was a downed telephone line. The fire was officially declared 100 percent contained on August 6.

== Effects and aftermath ==
The Range 12 Fire burned 176,600 acres of land before containment and cost $1.7 million (equivalent to $2.3 million in 2025) to be put out. The fire affected large parts of the Hanford Reach National Monument and the Arid Lands Ecology Reserve with 35,000 acres of the reserve being burnt. Following surveys by biologists immediately after the fire, the reserve was described as a "moonscape", as the reserve had a virtually full loss of sagebrushes and bunchgrasses with exposed topsoil. On January 25, 2018, multiple cattle ranchers based in the Lower Yakima River Valley filed a $15 million lawsuit against the Department of Defense, arguing that the U.S. Army acted recklessly in allowing a live fire exercise to occur on July 30 while a red flag warning was in effect. The lawsuit was later dismissed in 2022 after the court concluded it did not have the jurisdiction to handle the case due to the plaintiffs' claims being barred by sovereign immunity because of the discretionary function exemption in the Federal Tort Claims Act.
