= Washington State Route 241 =

State highway serving Yakima and Benton counties

State Route 241
- Map of eastern Yakima County with SR 241 highlighted in red

Route information
- Auxiliary route of SR 24
- Maintained by WSDOT
- Length: 25.18 mi (40.52 km)
- Existed: 1967–present

Major junctions
- South end: SR 22 in Mabton
- I-82 / US 12 in Sunnyside
- North end: SR 24 near Hanford

Location
- Country: United States
- State: Washington
- Counties: Yakima, Benton

Highway system
- State highways in Washington; Interstate; US; State; Scenic; Pre-1964; 1964 renumbering; Former
| ← SR 240 | → SR 243 |

State Route 241 (SR 241) is a north–south state highway serving Yakima and Benton counties in the U.S. state of Washington. The 25-mile (40 km) highway begins at SR 22 in Mabton and travels north to Sunnyside, where it intersects Interstate 82 (I-82) and U.S. Route 12 (US 12). SR 241 continues north into the Rattlesnake Hills and ends at a junction with SR 24.

Prior to the formal establishment of SR 241 in 1970, the highway between Sunnyside and the Rattlesnake Hills was briefly designated as Secondary State Highway 3V (SSH 3V). SR 241 was moved during the construction of I-82 during the 1980s and was extended south to Mabton in 1991.

== Route description ==
SR 241 begins as an extension of Boundary Road at an intersection with SR 22 in Mabton, located at the northeastern edge of the Yakama Indian Reservation. The highway travels northeast towards downtown Mabton, crossing over a section of the BNSF Railway's Yakima Valley subdivision, and turns north at Washington Street to follow 1st Avenue on the border between the Yakama Indian Reservation and Mabton. SR 241 leaves Mabton after passing several suburban blocks and crosses over the Yakima River near a boat launch in the Sunnyside State Wildlife Recreation Area.

The highway continues north through Givens Corner and across flat farmland predominately used for herb growing and vineyards. In the southern outskirts of Sunnyside, SR 241 briefly turns east on Alexander Road and north on Waneta Road to intersect I-82 and US 12 at a diamond interchange. The interchange is also the planned location of a new hospital building for the Astria Health system. The highway continues north and crosses over the Central Washington Railroad and the Lower Yakima Valley Pathway trail at an intersection with the Yakima Valley Highway (formerly part of US 12).

SR 241 travels around the eastern outskirts of Sunnyside, passing several food processing plants and the Sunnyside Municipal Airport, before leaving the city. It continues north into rolling farmland on Hanford Road, turning northeast to follow Sulphur Creek as it ascends into the Rattlesnake Hills. Within the Rattlesnake Hills, the highway leaves the creek and crosses barren rangelands and shrub-steppe highlands. SR 241 turns north and northeasterly to follow a pass in the hills and begins its descent into the pastures of the Black Rock Valley. The highway briefly crosses into Benton County and re-enters Yakima County while turning northwest to avoid a part of the Yakima Ridge. SR 241 terminates at a junction with SR 24, the main east–west route between Yakima and the Hanford area, at the Silver Dollar Cafe.

SR 241 is maintained by the Washington State Department of Transportation (WSDOT), which conducts an annual survey of traffic volumes on state highways measured in terms of annual average daily traffic. Traffic volumes on the highway range from a minimum of 1,600 vehicles near its northern terminus in the Rattlesnake Hills to a maximum of 14,000 vehicles at its interchange with I-82.

== History ==
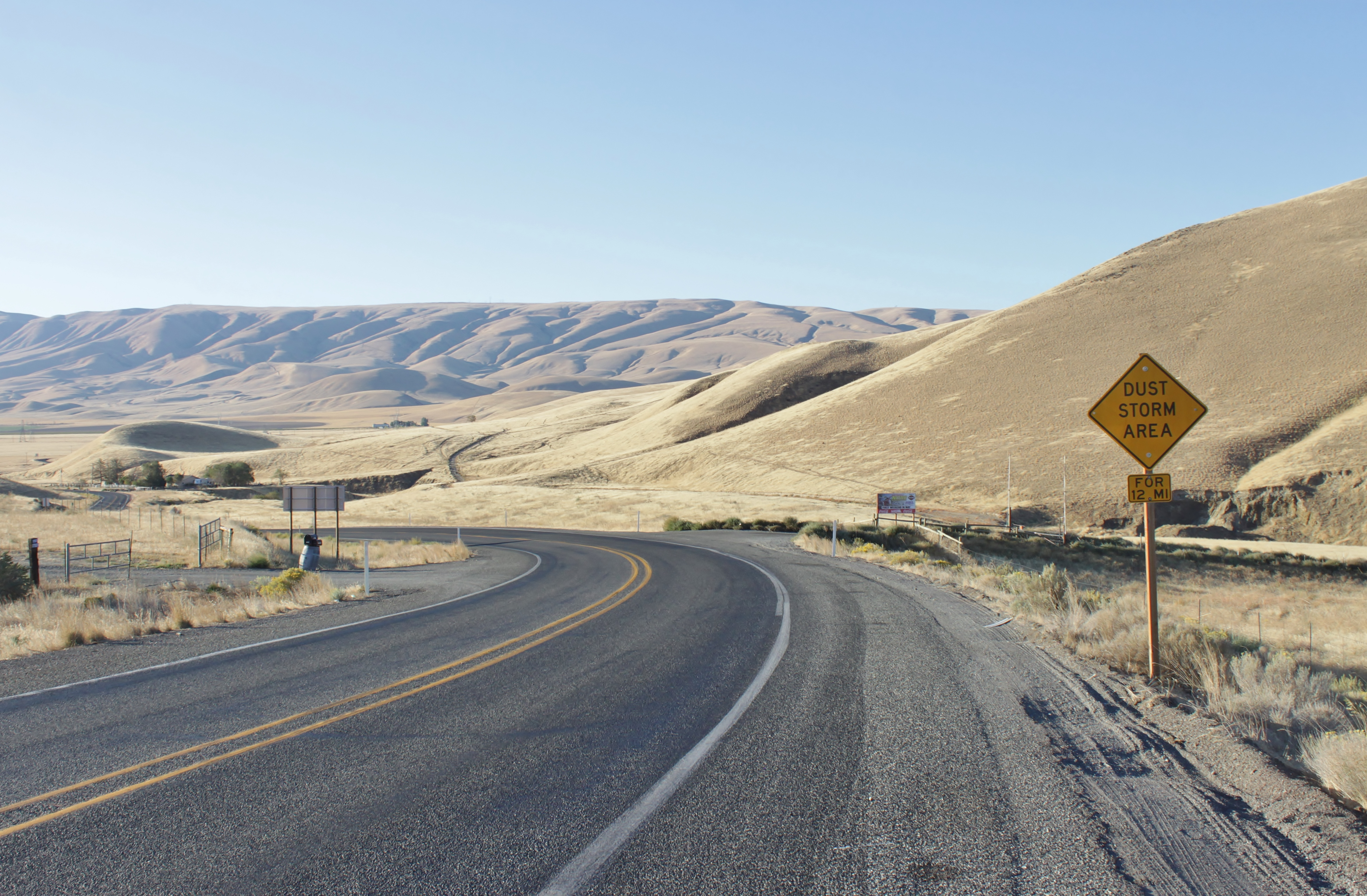
Looking south on SR 241 from its northern terminus at SR 24

SR 241 follows a section of the 19th-century White Bluffs Road, which connected Sunnyside to the White Bluffs ferry crossing on the Columbia River. A county road connecting Sunnyside to Mabton was constructed by the early 1910s and paved during the following decade. The original bridge over the Yakima River was replaced in 1954 by a new span. The state legislature created SR 241 in 1967, assigning it the unsigned designation of Secondary State Highway 3V (SSH 3V). The highway connected US 12 and Sunnyside to SSH 11A in the Rattlesnake Hills. The assignment came during the transition between highway numbering systems, which was completed in 1970; SR 241 was officially signed, while SR 24 replaced SSH 11A under the new system. Several low-speed curves on sections of the highway were improved to handle higher-speed travel.

The three bridges carrying the highway over the Rosa Irrigation Canal system northeast of Sunnyside were rebuilt by the state government in 1977. SR 241 was extended south to the Waneta Road interchange on I-82 in 1987, five years after the freeway was completed through Sunnyside. The initial selection of Waneta Road instead of the Sunnyside–Mabton Road was controversial with Mabton residents and officials, who sought to change the state government's tentative plans in the 1970s. The state government ultimately chose the Waneta interchange, but promised improvements to nearby roads to appease Mabton. SR 241 was extended further south to a junction with SR 22 in Mabton in 1992, following an act of the state legislature the previous year. The extension had been investigated by a legislative committee in 1986.

The highway is periodically closed during wintertime due to large snow drifts caused by high winds, necessitating the construction of snow fences along sections of SR 241. The fences were, however, damaged in 2016 by wildfires and were not replaced due to funding shortfalls.

== Major intersections ==
| County | Location | mi | km | Destinations | Notes |
|---|---|---|---|---|---|
| Yakima | Mabton | 0.00 | 0.00 | SR 22 – Toppenish, Prosser | Southern terminus |
| Yakima | Sunnyside | 7.54 | 12.13 | I-82 / US 12 – Yakima, Prosser | |
| Benton | No major junctions | | | | |
| Yakima | | 25.18 | 40.52 | SR 24 – Yakima, Vernita | Northern terminus |
1.000 mi = 1.609 km; 1.000 km = 0.621 mi
