= 2016 Washington wildfires =

Wildfire season in Washington, United States

Statistics
- Total fires: 1,272
- Total area: 293,717 acres (118,863 ha)

Impacts
- Deaths: 0
- Cost: $39,667,371.00

The 2016 Washington wildfires season were a series of wildfires in the U.S. state of Washington, notable because of brush fires near the Hanford Nuclear Reservation, and because of brush fires near Spokane, Washington.

During the summer of 2016 (in July and August particularly during the Range 12 fire), there was grave concern about the fires in eastern Washington due to the Hanford Nuclear Reservation in Benton County, Washington, and about rare and endangered species that may have been affected by the fire. Also of concern were the sheep and cattle killed during the fire.

== Background ==
While the typical "fire season" in Washington varies every year based on weather conditions, most wildfires occur in between July and October. However, hotter, drier conditions can allow wildfires to start outside of these boundaries. Wildfires tend to start at these times of the year after moisture from winter and spring precipitation dries up. Vegetation and overall conditions are the hottest and driest in these periods. The increase of vegetation can make the fires spread easier.

== Range 12 fire ==
main: Range 12 fire

The Range 12 fire was started on July 31 and quickly grew to over 177,000 acres (72,000 ha), covering parts of Benton county and Yakima county, before being contained in August. The fire was the third in recent years to affect the area surrounding the Hanford Reach National Monument and the Arid Lands Ecology Reserve, but was contained during the earlier days of August through the use of controlled burns.

== Other fires ==
In late July, two fires in eastern Yakima County and southern Grant County burned more than 1,500 acres (610 ha) before being contained.

In August, the area surrounding Spokane, the state's second largest city, was threatened with three active wildfires.

In late August, Wellesley and Yale fires merged to form the Spokane Complex Fire. Mandatory evacuations were ordered for residents in the Moccasin Bay area of Spangle. By August 22, fires in Spokane County had destroyed 10 homes. The Hart Road Fire in nearby Lincoln County grew to more than 1,600 acres (650 ha) and triggered the evacuation of nearby residents, and destroyed 11 homes.

A series of lightning strike fires in the Olympic Mountains were visible from the Seattle area and lowered air quality to "moderate" levels as rated by the Puget Sound Clean Air Agency.

On August 23, Governor Jay Inslee declared a state of emergency in 20 of Washington's 39 counties, mostly in Eastern Washington, citing limited local firefighting resources. Inslee blamed ongoing climate change for creating "explosive conditions" in the state's forests and wild lands, fueling stronger wildfires in recent years.

Another pair of lightning strike fires in the Glacier Peak Wilderness created hazy conditions over Wenatchee to the east.

== List of wildfires ==
Name	County	Acres	Start date	Contained Date (Note: Containment means that fire crews have established and secured control lines around the fire's perimeter. These lines are artificial barriers, like trenches or cleared vegetation, designed to stop the fire's spread, or natural barriers like rivers. Containment reflects progress in managing the fire but does not necessarily mean the fire is starved of fuel, under control, or put out.)	Cause	Notes
Buck Creek	Chelan	1,987	July 22, 2016		Lightning	
Deep North	Stevens	617	August 21, 2016		Unknown	
Hart	Lincoln	18,220	August 20, 2016		Unknown	
Olympic National Park fires	Jefferson	955			Lightning	Consisted of four fires: Cox Valley, Godkin, Hayes, and Ignar Creek
Range 12	Yakima, Benton	176,600	July 30, 2016	August 5, 2016	Military exercise	Findings of fact in a federal court case document that a brush fire was started by machine-gun fire.
Snake River	Garfield	11,452	August 2, 2016	August 7, 2016	Unknown	
Spokane Complex	Spokane	7,251	August 21, 2016		Unknown	Formed out of Wellesley and Yale Road fires

== See also ==
- List of Washington wildfires
