= Rattlesnake Hills =

Mountain ridge in Washington, United States

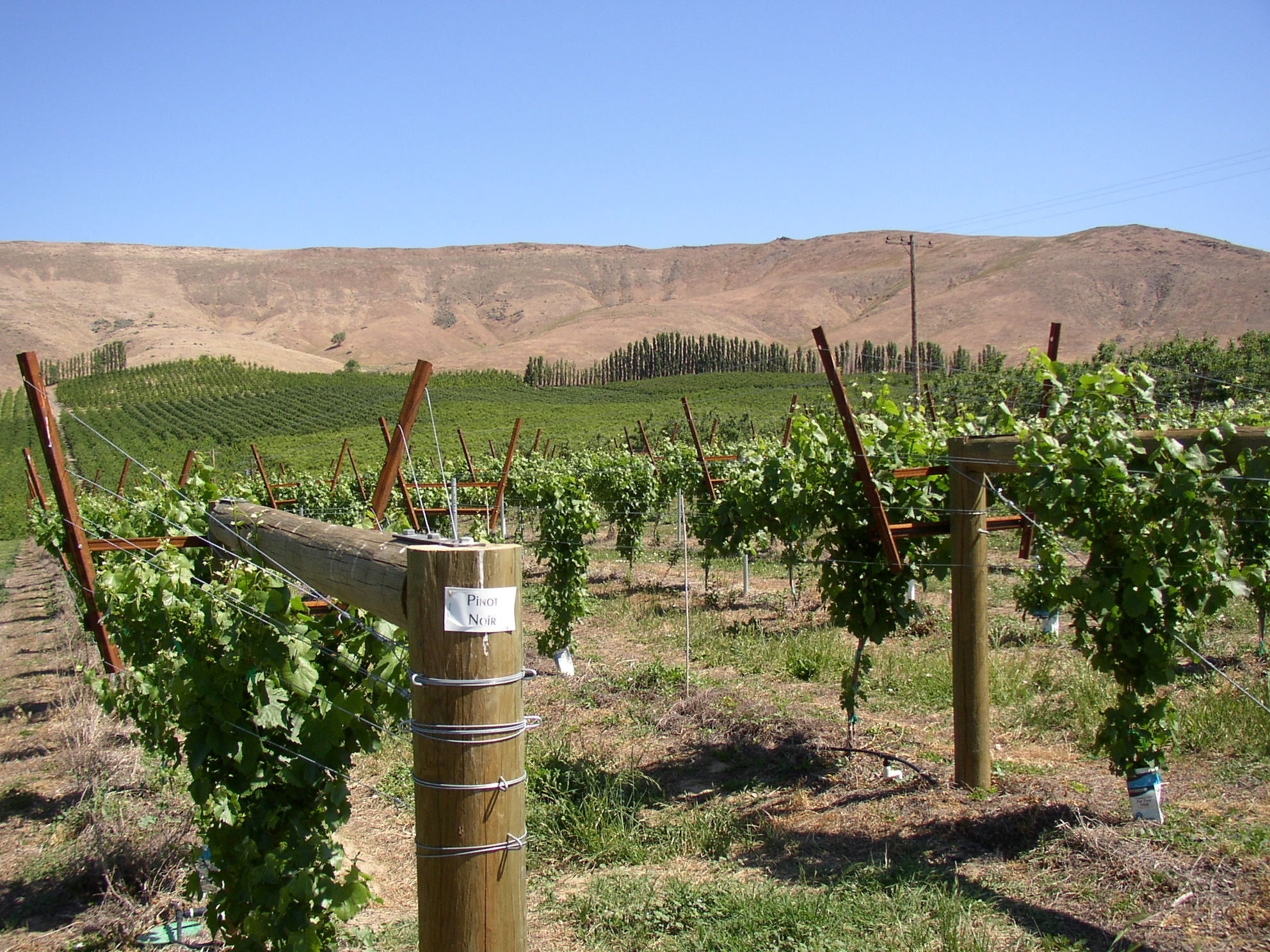
- Rattlesnake Hills as backdrop to vineyard

Highest point
- Peak: Lookout Summit
- Elevation: 3,629 ft (1,106 m)
- Prominence: 1,829 ft (557 m)
- Coordinates: 46°26′51″N 119°50′24″W

Geography
- Country: United States
- State: Washington
- Counties: Yakima and Benton
- Range coordinates: 46°27′N 119°50′W

The Rattlesnake Hills, also known as Rattlesnake Ridge, is a 16-mile (26 km) long anticline mountain ridge in Yakima County and Benton County in the U.S. state of Washington. It should not be confused with the much smaller Rattlesnake Ridge located near the west end of Ahtanum Ridge just south of Yakima, Washington and west of Union Gap, Washington. The highest point in the hills (as well as Benton County) is the 3,629 feet (1,106 m) Lookout Summit, which surpasses the more well-known Rattlesnake Mountain by approximately 100 ft (30 m). The Rattlesnake Hills are part of the Yakima Fold Belt of east-tending long ridges formed by the folding of Miocene Columbia River basalt flows.

The Rattlesnake Hills form the northern edge of the Yakima Valley, running from the vicinity of Benton City to just south of the city of Yakima, where the Yakima River cuts through the mountain ridge via Union Gap. To the west of the Yakima River the mountain ridge is known as Ahtanum Ridge.

North of the Rattlesnake Hills is Moxee Valley and the Black Rock Valley. The hills extend into the Hanford Site. A spur on the north side of the ridge nearly connects with the west end of Yakima Ridge.

Roza Canal, used for agricultural irrigation, passes under the Rattlesnake Hills through a tunnel.

Named high points of the Rattlesnake Hills, according to the USGS, include Elephant Mountain, Zillah Peak, Eagle Peak, High Top, Lookout, and Rattlesnake Mountain.

== Rattlesnake Hills Viticultural Area ==
Rattlesnake Hills is also an American Viticultural Area (AVA) located in Yakima County in Washington state. It was established as the nation's 172^{nd} and the state's ninth appellation on February 16, 2006 by the Alcohol and Tobacco Tax and Trade Bureau (TTB), Treasury after reviewing the petition submitted by Mr. Gail Puryear, owner of Bonair Winery, on behalf of himself and ten local vineyard and winery owners proposing the viticultural area named "Rattlesnake Hills." The 68,500-acre (107 sq mi) viticultural area became the second sub-appellation within the Yakima Valley AVA and also the sixth within the vast Columbia Valley AVA cultivating about 1,500 acres (607 ha). The hills define the northern boundary of Yakima Valley and the terrain includes the acreage between the north bank of the Sunnyside Canal and the entirety of the southern slopes of Rattlesnake Hills between Outlook and the Wapato Dam. The appellation is centered around the city of Zillah where elevations range from 850 to 3,085 feet (259–940 m) encompassing the highest point in Yakima Valley.

== Geology ==
=== Yakima Fold Belt ===
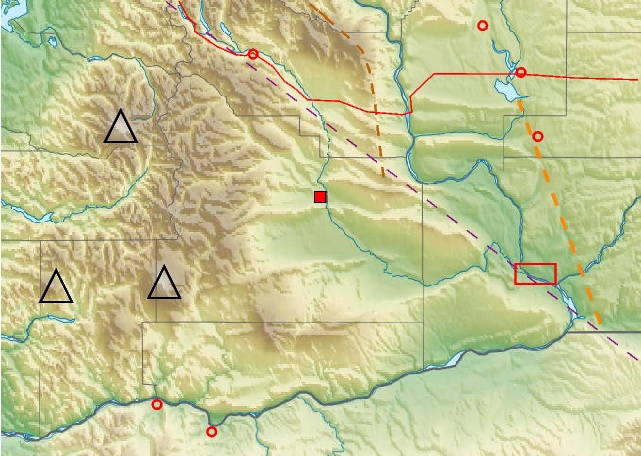
Shaded-relief map showing ridges of the Yakima Fold Belt of south-central Washington. The box on right is the Tri-Cities, Washington, and the ridge north of the Yakima River (directly west of the Tri-Cities) is what is often called the "Rattlesnake Hills".

The Rattlesnake Ridge is one of the larger "folds" in the Yakima Fold Belt. The Yakima Fold Belt is an area of topographical folds (or wrinkles) raised by tectonic compression. It is a 14,000 km^{2} (5,400 sq mi) structural-tectonic sub province of the western Columbia Plateau Province resulting from complex and poorly understood regional tectonics. The folds are associated with geological faults whose seismic risk is of particular concern to the nuclear facilities at the Hanford Nuclear Reservation (immediately north of the Rattlesnake Hills) and major dams on the Columbia and Snake Rivers.

=== Landslide ===
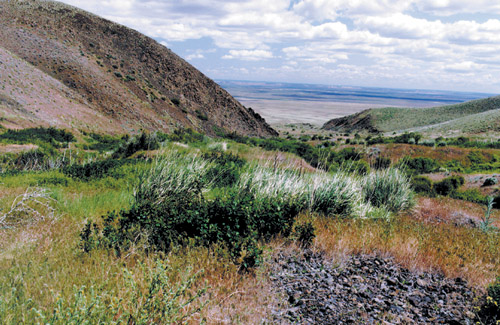
Vegetation on the north side of Rattlesnake Ridge in the Hanford Reach National Monument in Benton County.

A large but slow-moving landslide, about three miles (4.8 km) south of Yakima, was discovered in late 2017, after a long fissure was discovered high on Rattlesnake Ridge: this fissure was reported to be 250 feet deep in one place. The slide area sits adjacent to a gravel quarry at the south end of the ridge, and, fearing a major disaster, quarry engineers called for the evacuation of nearby homes. The slide area also lies above a section of Interstate 82, and a major slide on the ridge could close the highway.

On the weekend of January 20–21, 2018 there was flurry of new reporting, which highlighted fears that the landslide would collapse suddenly within weeks or months if not weeks. Officials in Yakima County and Union Gap declared an official disaster, and seismologists led by Amanda Thomas of the University of Oregon deployed an array of equipment to monitor the long-term behavior of the landslide. The slide's motion slowed from a maximum of 1.6 feet (49 cm) per week in 2018, to approximately 1 inch (2.5 cm) per week in 2025, and although it caused the closure of a nearby frontage road, Thorp Road, it was determined not to be a threat to the highway. Instead, it was expected that the slide would gradually build up a "self buttress" and slow to a stop.

== 2016 wildfire ==
The Range 12 fire was started on July 31, 2016, in eastern Washington, at the Yakima Training Center northeast of Yakima, Washington. The city it started closest to was Moxee, Washington on July 30, 2016 local time. It quickly grew to over 176,000 acres (71,000 ha) to cover parts of Yakima County and Benton County. The fire was the third in recent years to affect the area surrounding the Hanford Reach National Monument and the Arid Lands Ecology Reserve near Rattlesnake Ridge. The fire was eventually contained through the use of controlled burns on Rattlesnake Mountain in Benton County due to concerns that the fire was getting too close to the Hanford Nuclear Reservation, which had recently been compared to the Fukushima nuclear disaster by Newsweek magazine.
