= Lookout Summit =

Mountain in Washington (state), United States

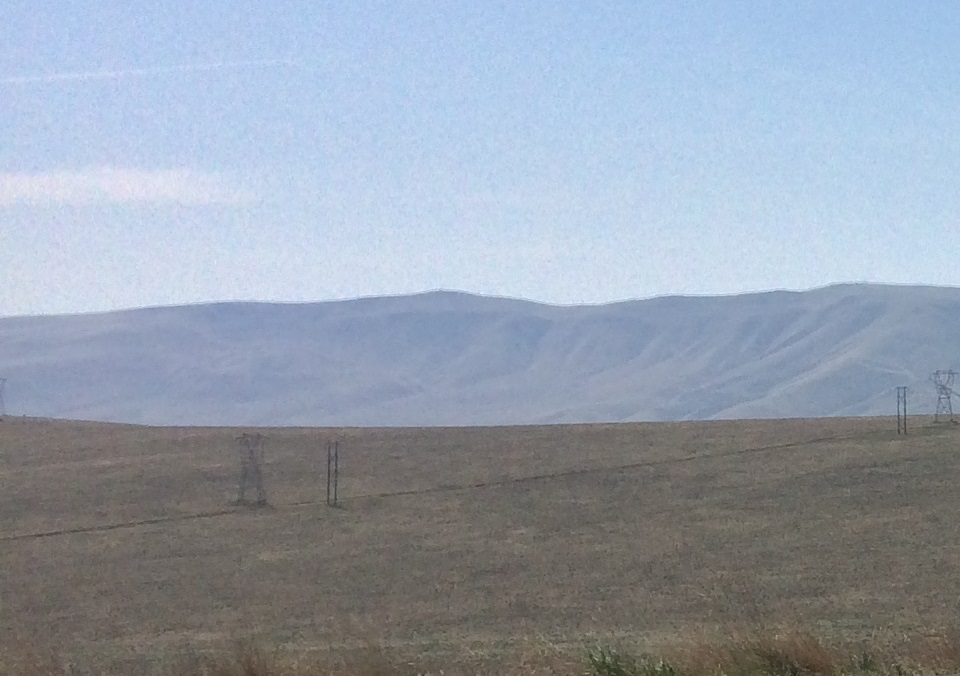
- The summit of Lookout Summit

Highest point
- Elevation: 3,629 ft (1,106 m)
- Prominence: 1,829 ft (557 m)
- Isolation: 12.94 mi (20.82 km)
- Listing: Washington isolated peaks 32nd; Washington most prominent peaks 181st; Washington county high points 29th
- Coordinates: 46°26′51″N 119°50′24″W

Geography
- Location: Benton County, Washington
- Parent range: Rattlesnake Hills
- Topo map: USGS Maiden Spring

Lookout Summit—officially listed as "Lookout" in the Geographic Names Information System—is the highest point in Benton County, in the U.S. state of Washington. The mountain is also the highest point in the Rattlesnake Hills, with an elevation 98 ft (30 m) higher than the neighboring, more-well-known Rattlesnake Mountain—which is the second highest peak in the range (as well as the county).

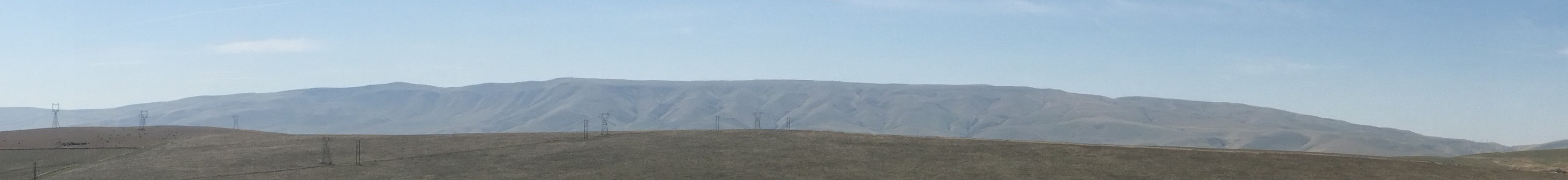
Panorama of Lookout Summit taken from Washington State Route 24.
