= Desert Aire, Washington =

- Census-designated place
- Location of Desert Aire, Washington
- Coordinates: 46°41′14″N 119°55′52″W
- Country: United States
- State: Washington
- County: Grant

Area
  - Total: 6.1 sq mi (15.8 km^{2})
  - Land: 3.4 sq mi (8.8 km^{2})
  - Water: 2.7 sq mi (7.0 km^{2})
- Elevation: 525 ft (160 m)

Population (2020)
  - Total: 2,288
  - Density: 670/sq mi (260/km^{2})
- Time zone: UTC-8 (Pacific (PST))
  - Summer (DST): UTC-7 (PDT)
- ZIP code: 99349
- Area code: 509
- FIPS code: 53-17617
- GNIS feature ID: 2408663

Desert Aire is a census-designated place (CDP) in Grant County, Washington, United States. The population was 2,288 at the 2020 census up from 1,626 at the 2010 census.

== History ==
In the late 1960s, a group of investors led by Harry Davidson, of Harry Davidson, Inc., bought 3,200 acres (13 km^{2}) of land along the Columbia River near the Priest Rapids Dam for some $1,000,000. Davidson cut in a runway and flew investors into his airport community in a Douglas DC-3. They developed a planned community of some 1,600 homes centered on the airport, a golf course and marina, which opened beginning in 1970. In 1994 the Grant County Airport District #1 was formed and now maintains the regional public-use airport in the community.

== Geography ==
Desert Aire is located near the southwest corner of Grant County on the east bank of the Columbia River where it is part of Priest Rapids Lake. Washington State Route 243 forms the eastern edge of the CDP; the highway leads north 5 miles (8 km) to Mattawa and 20 miles (32 km) to Interstate 90 across the Columbia River from Vantage. To the southeast SR 243 leads 11 miles (18 km) to SR 24 at the Vernita Bridge over the Columbia.

According to the United States Census Bureau, the Desert Aire CDP has a total area of 6.1 square miles (15.8 km^{2}), of which 3.4 square miles (8.8 km^{2}) are land and 2.7 square miles (7.0 km^{2}), or 44.32%, are water. The CDP extends out to the middle of the Columbia River, where it is bordered by Yakima County to the west.

=== Climate ===
Desert Aire has some of the hottest temperatures in Washington during the summer and is one of the driest places in the state, being located in the rain shadow of both the Cascades and the Umtanums.

Average temperatures in July are a maximum of 91.4 °F (33.0 °C) and a minimum of 64.8 °F (18.2 °C). In January, the average maximum is 40 °F (4 °C) and the minimum is 26 °F (−3 °C). Rainfall averages only 7 inches (180 mm) per year, and the average snowfall is 6 inches (150 mm). On November 24, 2010, the temperature feel to 1 °F; the station has not been colder than this since before the year 2000.

Climate data for Priest Rapids Dam
Month	Jan	Feb	Mar	Apr	May	Jun	Jul	Aug	Sep	Oct	Nov	Dec	Year
Record high °F (°C)	71 (22)	72 (22)	82 (28)	94 (34)	105 (41)	110 (43)	112 (44)	110 (43)	105 (41)	92 (33)	76 (24)	71 (22)	112 (44)
Mean daily maximum °F (°C)	40.5 (4.7)	47.5 (8.6)	57.3 (14.1)	65.7 (18.7)	75.0 (23.9)	82.8 (28.2)	91.4 (33.0)	90.1 (32.3)	80.6 (27.0)	65.8 (18.8)	50.2 (10.1)	40.3 (4.6)	65.6 (18.7)
Mean daily minimum °F (°C)	27.1 (−2.7)	31.1 (−0.5)	36.9 (2.7)	43.3 (6.3)	51.3 (10.7)	58.4 (14.7)	64.8 (18.2)	64.4 (18.0)	56.1 (13.4)	44.4 (6.9)	34.9 (1.6)	27.6 (−2.4)	45.0 (7.2)
Record low °F (°C)	−12 (−24)	−10 (−23)	11 (−12)	25 (−4)	29 (−2)	35 (2)	47 (8)	42 (6)	33 (1)	18 (−8)	−7 (−22)	−7 (−22)	−12 (−24)
Average precipitation inches (mm)	0.90 (23)	0.67 (17)	0.64 (16)	0.48 (12)	0.46 (12)	0.44 (11)	0.19 (4.8)	0.23 (5.8)	0.28 (7.1)	0.50 (13)	1.01 (26)	1.21 (31)	7.01 (178.7)
Average snowfall inches (cm)	2.6 (6.6)	0.7 (1.8)	0.1 (0.25)	0.0 (0.0)	0.0 (0.0)	0.0 (0.0)	0.0 (0.0)	0.0 (0.0)	0.0 (0.0)	0.0 (0.0)	0.6 (1.5)	1.9 (4.8)	5.9 (14.95)

== Demographics ==
Historical population
Census	Pop.	Note	%±
2000	1,124		—
2010	1,626		44.7%
2020	2,288		40.7%
U.S. Decennial Census; 1990 2000 2010

Desert Aire first appeared as a census designated place in the 2000 U.S. census.

=== Racial and ethnic composition ===
Desert Aire CDP, Washington – Racial and ethnic composition Note: the US Census treats Hispanic/Latino as an ethnic category. This table excludes Latinos from the racial categories and assigns them to a separate category. Hispanics/Latinos may be of any race.
Race / Ethnicity (NH = Non-Hispanic)	Pop 2000	Pop 2010	Pop 2020	% 2000	% 2010	% 2020
White alone (NH)	569	763	773	50.62%	46.92%	33.78%
Black or African American alone (NH)	2	2	6	0.18%	0.12%	0.26%
Native American or Alaska Native alone (NH)	2	3	18	0.18%	0.18%	0.79%
Asian alone (NH)	7	1	13	0.62%	0.06%	0.57%
Native Hawaiian or Pacific Islander alone (NH)	0	0	0	0.00%	0.00%	0.00%
Other race alone (NH)	0	2	6	0.00%	0.12%	0.26%
Mixed race or Multiracial (NH)	17	21	38	1.51%	1.29%	1.66%
Hispanic or Latino (any race)	527	834	1,434	46.89%	51.29%	62.67%
Total	1,124	1,626	2,288	100.00%	100.00%	100.00%

=== 2000 census ===
As of the census of 2000, there were 1,124 people, 371 households, and 296 families residing in the CDP. The population density was 344.0 people per square mile (132.7/km^{2}). There were 723 housing units at an average density of 221.3/sq mi (85.4/km^{2}). The racial makeup of the CDP was 64.50% White, 0.18% African American, 0.18% Native American, 0.62% Asian, 30.96% from other races, and 3.56% from two or more races. Hispanic or Latino of any race were 46.89% of the population.

There were 371 households, out of which 35.3% had children under the age of 18 living with them, 70.4% were married couples living together, 4.9% had a female householder with no husband present, and 20.2% were non-families. 16.7% of all households were made up of individuals, and 6.7% had someone living alone who was 65 years of age or older. The average household size was 3.03 and the average family size was 3.35.

In the CDP, the age distribution of the population shows 31.2% under the age of 18, 7.0% from 18 to 24, 25.4% from 25 to 44, 21.4% from 45 to 64, and 14.9% who were 65 years of age or older. The median age was 32 years. For every 100 females, there were 107.0 males. For every 100 females age 18 and over, there were 112.4 males.

The median income for a household in the CDP was $35,719, and the median income for a family was $36,971. Males had a median income of $25,417 versus $20,188 for females. The per capita income for the CDP was $18,719. About 4.9% of families and 6.5% of the population were below the poverty line, including 9.1% of those under age 18 and none of those age 65 or over.

== Education ==
The area is served by the Wahluke School District.
