= Port of Mattawa =

Port in The USA

- Formation: November 4, 1958
- Type: Port authority
- Purpose: The economic and business development of southern Grant County
- Headquarters: 20140 Road 24 SW Mattawa, WA 99349
- Coordinates: 46°44′17″N 119°55′14″W
- Region served: Grant County, Washington, US
- Executive Director: Lars Leland
- Main organ: Port of Mattawa Commission
- Website: portofmattawa.org

The Port of Mattawa is a port district in southern Grant County. Its creation was approved by the voters of Grant County, Washington state, on November 4, 1958. The City of Mattawa and Desert Aire are communities within the Port of Mattawa's district.

The port retains three major properties, Wahluke Industrial Park, Sentinel Gap Industrial Park and the Pat-Chee Industrial Park.

== History ==
The port came into being on November 4, 1958 by the citizens of the Mattawa area. During the 1950s and 1960s, the port district focused on industrial development.

In 1964, the Port of Mattawa joined the Washington Public Ports Association.

In 1997 the port purchased properties for business development.

In 2008 the port received funding through loans and grants to create a wastewater facility for wine processing.

== Management ==
The current Executive Director, since 2014, is Lars Leland. There are also three members of the Board of Commissioners: Verlyn Coulson (District 1), Lauri Dayton (District 2), and Glenn Leland (District 3).
