= Vernita Bridge =

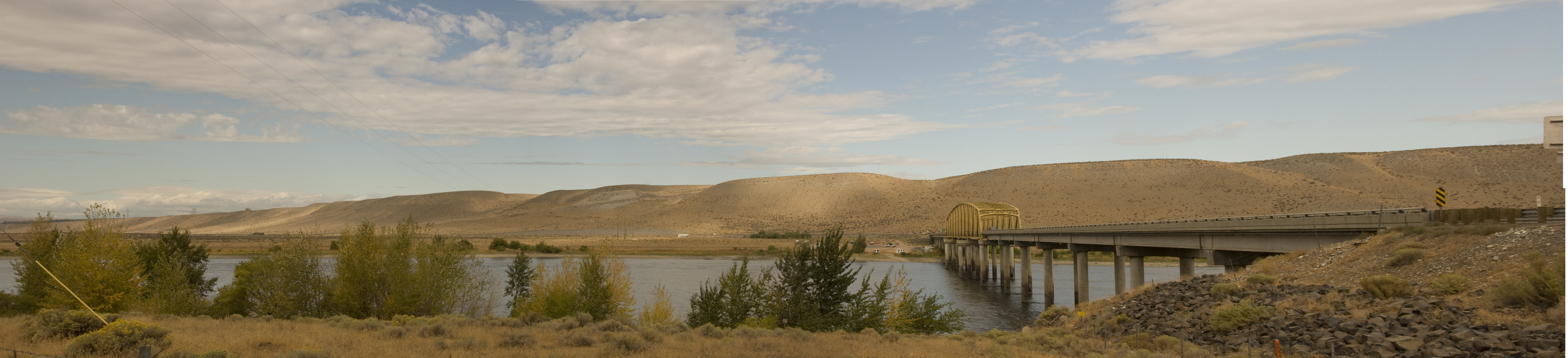
- Vernita Bridge
- Coordinates: 46°38′32.97″N 119°43′58.09″W
- Carries: SR 24
- Crosses: Columbia River

Characteristics
- Design: Steel truss concrete girder
- Total length: 1,982 ft (604 m)

History
- Opened: 1965

The Vernita Bridge is a bridge on Washington State Route 24 over the Columbia River between Grant County and Benton County, located approximately 10 miles (16 km) south of Desert Aire and Mattawa, Washington. The bridge is in the Hanford Reach National Monument near the Hanford Site.

== Ferry ==
An oar and current powered ferry business was opened at Vernita in 1901, as an alternative to crossing at White Bluffs, several miles to the east. This was then replaced with a cable ferry in 1908. This operated until 1943, when the area was evacuated as part of the Manhattan Project. Washington State revived a public ferry service at the location in 1957 as part of their Highway initiative. This service remained in operation until 1965, when the bridge was constructed.

== Climate ==
The weather station near the Vernita Bridge is the location of the highest recorded July temperature in the state of Washington. This record was achieved when it reached 118 °F (48 °C), in 1928. This is also the site of the hottest April temperature in Washington, 103 °F (39 °C), in 1934. This is the only place in Washington where a temperature of above 100 °F (38 °C) has occurred in April. This happened two times: in 1926 and 1934.

Climate data for Wahluke, Washington
Month	Jan	Feb	Mar	Apr	May	Jun	Jul	Aug	Sep	Oct	Nov	Dec	Year
Record high °F (°C)	66 (19)	69 (21)	83 (28)	103 (39)	103 (39)	110 (43)	118 (48)	112 (44)	104 (40)	94 (34)	72 (22)	74 (23)	118 (48)
Mean daily maximum °F (°C)	37.9 (3.3)	45.5 (7.5)	59.5 (15.3)	70.2 (21.2)	77.8 (25.4)	84.8 (29.3)	94.7 (34.8)	92.6 (33.7)	82.2 (27.9)	68.9 (20.5)	50.9 (10.5)	40.7 (4.8)	67.1 (19.5)
Mean daily minimum °F (°C)	22.5 (−5.3)	27.2 (−2.7)	34.6 (1.4)	41.4 (5.2)	48.4 (9.1)	55.1 (12.8)	61.7 (16.5)	59.8 (15.4)	51.8 (11.0)	42.3 (5.7)	31.9 (−0.1)	26.3 (−3.2)	41.9 (5.5)
Record low °F (°C)	−20 (−29)	−15 (−26)	11 (−12)	19 (−7)	29 (−2)	33 (1)	41 (5)	36 (2)	20 (−7)	16 (−9)	7 (−14)	−21 (−29)	−21 (−29)
Average precipitation inches (mm)	0.85 (22)	0.73 (19)	0.39 (9.9)	0.36 (9.1)	0.43 (11)	0.51 (13)	0.20 (5.1)	0.23 (5.8)	0.36 (9.1)	0.59 (15)	1.03 (26)	0.29 (7.4)	5.97 (152.4)
Average snowfall inches (cm)	4.9 (12)	3.0 (7.6)	trace	0.0 (0.0)	0.0 (0.0)	0.0 (0.0)	0.0 (0.0)	0.0 (0.0)	0.0 (0.0)	0.0 (0.0)	1.4 (3.6)	3.3 (8.4)	16.0 (41)
