= Wahluke High School =

Location
- 505 N. Boundary, Mattawa, Washington; United States; 46°44′35″N 119°53′39″W

Information
- School district: Wahluke School District #73
- Principal: Cody Marlow
- Faculty: 42.15 (FTE)
- Enrollment: 797 (2022–2023)
- Student to teacher ratio: 18.91
- Color
- Team name: Warriors
- Website: Wahluke H.S.

Wahluke High School is a public high school located in Mattawa, Washington that serves about 850 students in grades 9–12. 94% of the students are Hispanic, while the other 6% are White or Native American.
