= Death of David Glenn Lewis =

1993 hit and run in Moxee, Washington, US

- Lewis, wearing the glasses that helped identify his body
- Date: February 1, 1993; 33 years ago
- Time: Approximately 10:30 p.m. (PST)
- Location: SR 24 and Rivard Road, Moxee, Washington, U.S.; 46.5500°N 120.3856°W
- Cause: Traffic collision
- Perpetrator: Unknown
- Burial: Westlawn Memorial Park, Dumas, Texas, U.S.

On the night of February 1, 1993, an unidentified man was struck and killed by a vehicle outside Moxee, Washington. It took 11 years for him to be identified as David Glenn Lewis, a missing lawyer from Amarillo, Texas. The reasons for his disappearance and journey 1,606 mi (2,585 km) away, and how he was able to get to Moxee from his home in 24 hours, remain unknown.

When he died, Lewis was wearing military-style camouflage fatigues and work boots, clothing his family did not recognize as his. His death was the result of injuries from the motor vehicle, but neither it nor its driver have ever been identified. It remains uncertain if his death was an accident or due to foul play.

== Background ==
A native of the Texas Panhandle, David Glenn Lewis was born on December 11, 1953, in Borger, near Amarillo. After graduating from Phillips High School, he attended Texas Tech, graduating in 1975 with a degree in political science, following that with a law degree from Tech in 1979. Lewis married his wife, Karen, in 1982; the couple had their only child, a daughter, shortly afterward.

Lewis and his family lived in Dumas, north of Amarillo. He both maintained a private practice and served as an assistant county attorney in Sherman and Wheeler counties. In 1986, he was elected judge of the court-at-law in Moore County; four years later he left that position to run, unsuccessfully, for the 69th District Court judgeship. He returned to private law practice with an Amarillo firm and taught government classes at Amarillo College.

== Disappearance ==
On January 28, 1993, Lewis left work at his law firm around midday, saying he was not feeling well and would be going home. Records show a gasoline purchase with his credit card that afternoon. He taught his class at the college that evening until 10 p.m. This was the last place and time in the Amarillo area he was seen alive that the authorities have released to the public.

The next day, a Friday, his wife and daughter left for a weekend shopping trip to Dallas. They did not see him before they left home. He had planned to stay over the weekend so he could watch the Dallas Cowboys, his favorite team, play in Super Bowl XXVII, their first appearance in the National Football League's championship game in 14 years. During the day, a member of the Lewises' church in Dumas reported seeing Lewis hurrying through the Southwest Airlines terminal at Amarillo International Airport. He did not appear to be carrying any luggage.

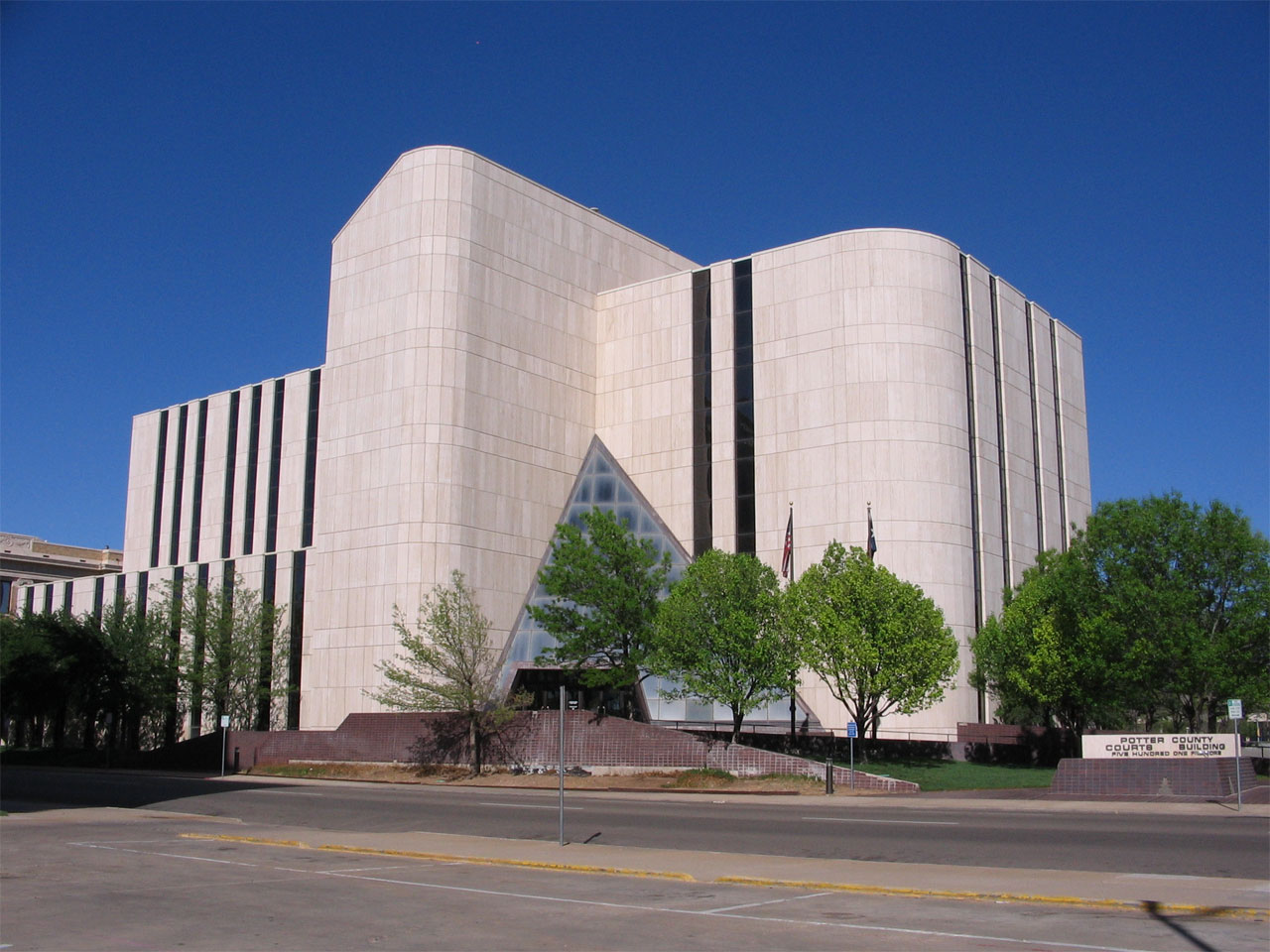
The Potter County courthouse, where Lewis's car was seen twice before it was found after his disappearance was reported

At 10:30 p.m. that night, a police officer patrolling downtown Amarillo saw a red Ford Explorer, the same color, make and model as Lewis's car, parked outside the Potter County courthouse. The next day, Saturday, it was gone. In Dumas, a neighbor saw Lewis's red Explorer parked in his driveway. Police reported the last confirmed sighting of Lewis as occurring sometime during the day on January 30, but have never released any details.

The next morning, Super Bowl Sunday, a deputy sheriff saw the Explorer parked by the county courthouse again. This time, a man matching Lewis's description was across the street, apparently photographing the building. His wife and daughter returned home from Dallas in the evening, after the game had ended. Lewis was not home, but they found the VCR was still recording the telecast, and had begun doing so before the game started. In the refrigerator there were two turkey sandwiches, and laundry had been left in the washing machine. His wedding ring and watch were on the kitchen counter. Karen Lewis assumed her husband had been watching the game, perhaps at a friend's house, and she returned to work afterwards.

The next day, February 1, a Dallas taxi driver later recalled taking a man looking like Lewis from a hotel to the Dallas-Fort Worth International Airport. He said the man seemed nervous and paid in cash from a wad of hundred-dollar bills. Back in the Amarillo area, after learning that Lewis had missed two work appointments, Karen called police to report him missing.

== Death ==
At approximately 10:30 p.m. on February 1 in the town of Moxee, Washington, just east of Yakima, motorists driving along SR 24 near its intersection with Rivard Road saw a man walking around in the road, apparently disoriented. Shortly after passing him, they turned around to warn oncoming motorists. When they returned to the location where they had seen him only a few minutes prior, they found this same man lying in the road, apparently the victim of a hit and run. He was pronounced dead at the scene. As the man carried no identification, he was considered an unidentified decedent and known simply as "John Doe".

== Investigation ==
Law enforcement in Washington began attempts to determine their John Doe's identity, while in Amarillo police opened an investigation into Lewis's disappearance.

=== Amarillo ===
By the end of the day he was reported missing, police had found Lewis's red Explorer downtown, again parked by the courthouse. They found his keys under the floor mat inside. Also in the car were his checkbook, driver's license and two gas-station credit cards. His wife reported only one item of his clothing she could not account for, a pair of green sweatpants.

When police investigated Lewis's financial activity over the weekend, the narrative grew complicated, suggesting he or someone with access to his account had made plans to travel outside the area. On January 30, the Saturday he was last seen, $5,000 had been deposited into his bank account; it could not be determined who did this. The next day, a plane ticket from Amarillo to Dallas was purchased in Lewis's name. Whether it was actually used could not be determined, nor could it be found whether Lewis himself bought the ticket or someone else bought it using Lewis's name. Another plane ticket, this time from Los Angeles to Dallas, was purchased under similar circumstances on the day Karen Lewis reported her husband missing.

Police considered the possibility that Lewis's work as a judge and lawyer might have made him some enemies determined to kill him. Karen recalled that he had received some death threats while on the bench. Since then, Lewis had represented a man in a suit brought against him by a son-in-law who had been convicted of murder. But while that client believed that Lewis had been killed over his legal work, he did not believe his son-in-law was responsible because he did not have the connections or resources to coordinate a revenge killing from prison.

At the time of his disappearance, Lewis had been a defendant in a suit brought against him and several other lawyers and a former client. His wife observed several months later that he was the only defendant in the case who had yet to be deposed, and wondered if the unresolved legal matter might have anything to do with his disappearance. His files on the case could not be found. But Lewis's lawyer doubted that the case had anything to do with his absence, believing no one involved would have gained by his death or disappearance.

Lewis's family continued to believe that he had met with foul play somehow. Karen noted that David was looking forward to his daughter's upcoming birthday. Friends said he was also talking about his upcoming career possibilities and pointed to his continued community involvement in the Boy Scouts and United Way. They did not believe he had disappeared voluntarily.

Police, on the other hand, believed Lewis might have disappeared of his own volition. They saw him as perhaps bitter over his election loss, and worried about slow business at the law firm and the prospects of losing the suit against him. "It has a lot of earmarkings [sic] of suicide", the lead detective on the case said. "People don't always do what you expect."

Some reports to police put Lewis in Tucson, Arizona, or Mexico. However, by June, the police admitted the investigation had reached a dead end. Police asked Karen Lewis to take a lie detector test; she refused, leading to tensions with the family. In 2002, the police closed the case, saying that the purchased plane tickets had led them to conclude that Lewis had disappeared of his own volition, with no sign of foul play.

=== Washington ===
The autopsy on John Doe showed he had died of injuries consistent with being struck by a vehicle. Blood tests found no evidence of any of the drugs they tested for. Whether the incident had been completely accidental or not could not be determined. The motorists who had found the body recalled having seen a Chevrolet Camaro heading in the opposite direction after they turned around, but it was never located, nor did any other witness come forward.

== Identification ==
Early in 2003, Pat Ditter, a Washington State Patrol (WSP) detective in the Yakima area, read a Seattle Post-Intelligencer series on the problems involved in investigating long-term missing-person cases. Law enforcement typically assigns them low priority and databases of such cases did not, at the time, communicate, making for fewer matches between missing persons and unidentified decedents than there could be. While most of the cases the articles discussed were in the Seattle area, the articles started him thinking about the Moxee John Doe.

"[He got to] thinking, 'if it can be wrong there, it can be wrong here'", said Ditter's supervisor. The series had focused on the shortcomings of the federal National Crime Information Center (NCIC) database, a proprietary tool commonly used by police agencies at all levels. Ditter wondered if Google, then gaining popularity among the online public, could instead offer some insight.

Ditter began searching Google for cases of missing men who were the same height and weight as Doe. Within a week he had developed a list of a dozen possible matches. One was Lewis, whose picture on two websites (one run by the Texas Department of Public Safety and the other from The Doe Network's pages) strongly resembled the photographs taken of the deceased Doe in 1993. The only issue was the distinctive glasses that Lewis wore; Doe had not been wearing any, although eyeglasses had been inventoried among his personal effects.

The clothing worn by Doe, military-style camouflage fatigues and work boots, had been kept in evidence by the WSP since his death. Ditter returned to take a look and found the glasses in the clothing pockets. They were a match, so he contacted the Amarillo police. DNA from a tissue sample also kept in evidence was compared with DNA from Lewis's mother. In October 2004, the University of North Texas reported that there was a 99.91 percent chance the two samples were from the same person, and both the missing person and unidentified decedent cases were closed. Lewis was reburied in a cemetery closer to home.

=== Unanswered questions ===
The identification of the Moxee John Doe as David Glenn Lewis resolved the question of his fate, but left unresolved how and why he had traveled from Amarillo to Yakima County in the span of a single day, as well as the identity of the driver of the car that struck him. There were no direct flights between the two cities, and the 1,606-mile (2,585 km) drive between them would take nearly 24 hours nonstop (by local time it would seem like 22 hours, since Washington is two time zones behind Amarillo). Lewis's family was not aware of any friends, family, professional colleagues, or any other possible connections to Washington.

The family believes, as they have since his disappearance, that Lewis was abducted, although they concede it is possible he went to Yakima voluntarily. Karen says that as far as she knew her husband did not own the fatigue-style clothing nor the work boots he had on when he was killed. She has also pointed out that he was not wearing his glasses at his death, though he usually wore eyeglasses at all times.

== See also ==
- List of solved missing person cases (post-2000)
- List of unsolved deaths
- Killing of Judy Smith, 1997 case where the body of a woman missing from central Philadelphia was found on a North Carolina mountainside five months later
