= Pacific Northwest Regional Observatory =

Observatory in Washington state, US

- Organization: Alliance for the Advancement of Science Through Astronomy
- Location: Horse Heaven Hills, Eastern Washington
- Coordinates: 46°00′15″N 118°53′30″W
- Altitude: 1,600 ft (490 m)
- Weather: semi-arid
- Established: November 1, 2012
- Website: pnro.org

Telescopes
- Richmond J. Hoch telescope: Cassegrain optical

The Pacific Northwest Regional Observatory is an astronomical observatory at the Wallula Gap in the Horse Heaven Hills, near the Columbia River in Southeast Washington. It is owned by Alliance for the Advancement of Science Through Astronomy. The main instrument, an 0.8 meter Cassegrain reflecting optical telescope, was formerly located at Rattlesnake Mountain above Richland, Washington, where it was installed in 1971 by Battelle, dismantled in 2009, and restored at Columbia Basin College in Richland c. 2010–2011. Construction of the observatory at Braden Research Farm, owned by Whitman College, broke ground in 2011, and the telescope mirror was placed there in November 2012.

As of 2007, the main instrument, then at Rattlesnake Mountain, was "the largest, most powerful, optical research-grade telescope in Washington State".

== See also ==
- List of observatories
