= Rattlesnake Mountain (Benton County, Washington) =

Mountain in Washington (state), United States

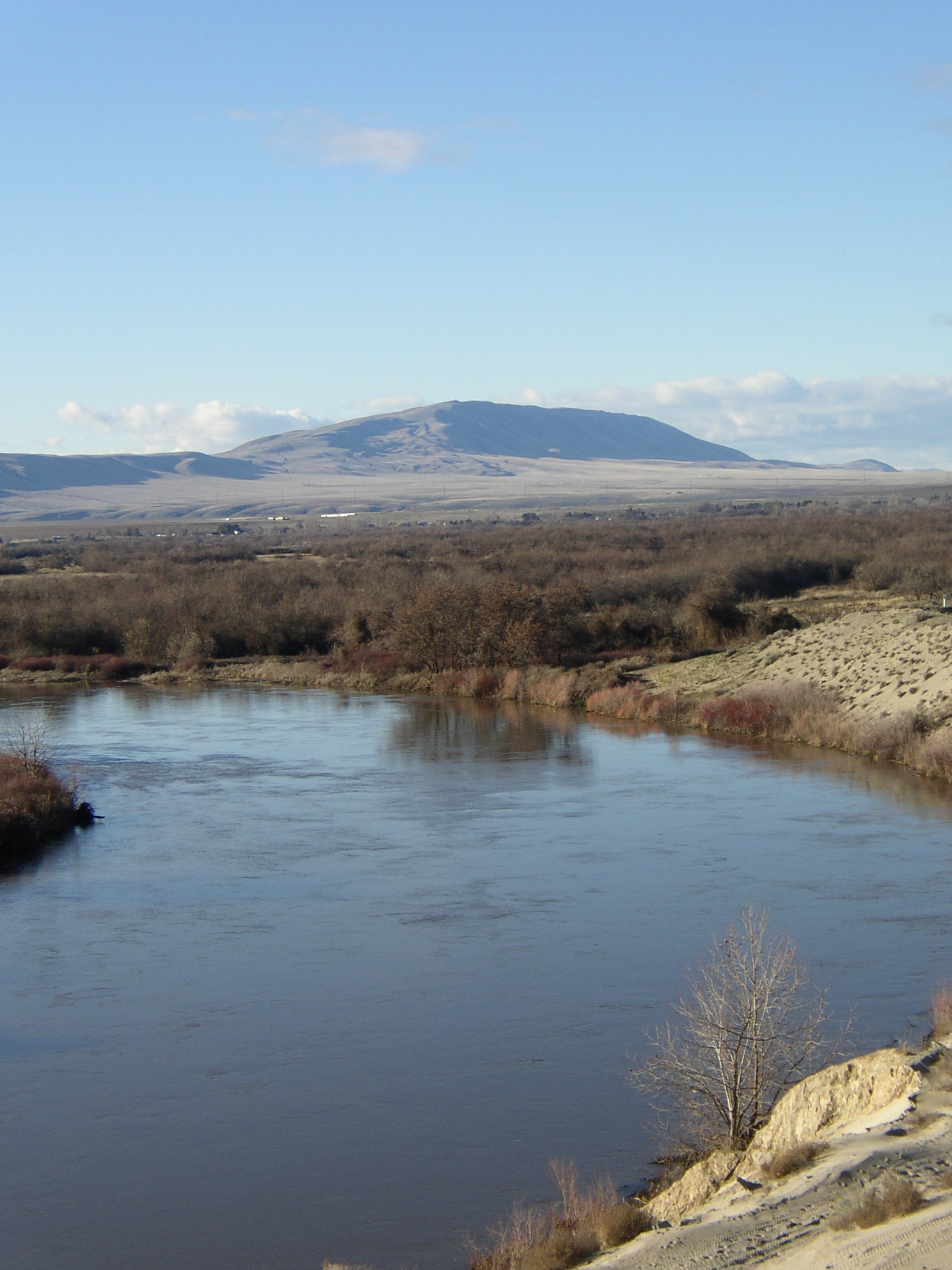
- The view of Rattlesnake Mountain from the Horn Rapids Golf Course in Richland.

Highest point
- Elevation: 3,531 ft (1,076 m)
- Prominence: 840 ft (260 m)
- Parent peak: Lookout Summit
- Isolation: 1.55 mi (2.49 km)
- Listing: Benton County highest peaks 2nd
- Coordinates: 46°24′56″N 119°37′49″W

Geography
- Location within Washington (state)
- Location: Benton County, Washington, U.S.
- Parent range: Rattlesnake Hills
- Topo maps: USGS Iowa Flats; USGS Snively Basin

Rattlesnake Mountain (Native American name Lalíik meaning "land above the water") is a 3,531 ft (1,060 m) windswept treeless ridge overlooking the Hanford nuclear site. Parts of the western slope are privately owned ranchland, while the eastern slope is under the federal protection of the Arid Lands Ecology Reserve, a unit of the Hanford Reach National Monument, managed by the United States Fish and Wildlife Service. The mountain is the second highest point in Benton County, with its neighbor Lookout Summit surpassing it by only 98 ft (30 m).

Rattlesnake Mountain is notable for its high wind speeds, with the highest recorded being around 150 mph (241 kilometers per hour).

== History ==
The Yakama Nation referred to Rattlesnake Mountain as Lalíik, meaning "land above the water". Some historians speculate that the origin of the name Lalíik refers to the inundation of the Columbia River Plateau during the Missoula Floods, as Rattlesnake would have been one of the few mountains not completely inundated by flood waters reaching depths of 1200 ft (366 m). Geologists have found glacial erratics on Rattlesnake at heights up to this level. However, there is scant evidence placing human settlements in the area at the time of the floods, 12 to 13 thousand years ago. Lalíik is held sacred by native peoples of the Columbia Plateau, including the Nez Perce, Umatilla, Wanapum, Cayuse, Walla Walla, and Yakama, and remains a spiritual epicenter to this day.

In 1943, Rattlesnake Mountain was seized by the United States government under eminent domain and became a buffer zone for the nuclear project at the Hanford site. In 1955, US Army installed a Nike Ajax missile base on the southeastern end of the ridge and maintained it until December 1958, when it was closed.

== Rattlesnake Mountain Observatory ==
The Rattlesnake Mountain Observatory was established at the summit in 1966, utilizing some of the former missile base infrastructure, and remained there until its relocation near Wallula, Washington in 2009. The observatory's main telescope was installed in 1971 and is a 32-inch (0.8-meter) telescope housed inside a 24-foot domed enclosure. This telescope is the largest permanently mounted telescope in Washington State. The telescope was used regularly through the early 1980s, but soon fell into disuse. Due to its location, renovations and upgrades were done to allow for remote control. Observatory operations were directed by a local nonprofit group founded by scientists and engineers from the Pacific Northwest National Laboratory at Hanford.

It was announced 14 March 2008 that the Department of Energy would not renew the permit, license or easements for the observatory or most of the other entities that maintain communication equipment on the mountain. The area would instead be returned to its natural conditions, citing the cultural sensitivity of the area. The removal of the observatory from Rattlesnake Mountain began in the latter part of May, 2009, and was completed in June of the same year. In late 2012, the telescope moved into its new home at Pacific Northwest Regional Observatory in the hills near Wallula, Washington.

== Public access ==
Section 3081, "Ensuring public access to the summit of Rattlesnake Mountain in the Hanford Reach National Monument", of the Carl Levin and Howard P. “Buck” McKeon National Defense Authorization Act for Fiscal Year 2015 directs the Secretary of the Interior to provide public access (including motorized access) to the summit of Rattlesnake Mountain. The Yakama Nation objected to opening their sacred site to motorized access. Access was expected to begin in Fall 2019, but it was still closed in October 2020 as the Fish and Wildlife Service has not released a final environmental study amid continued consultations.
