= Wahluke Slope =

Coordinates: 46°45′N 119°30′W

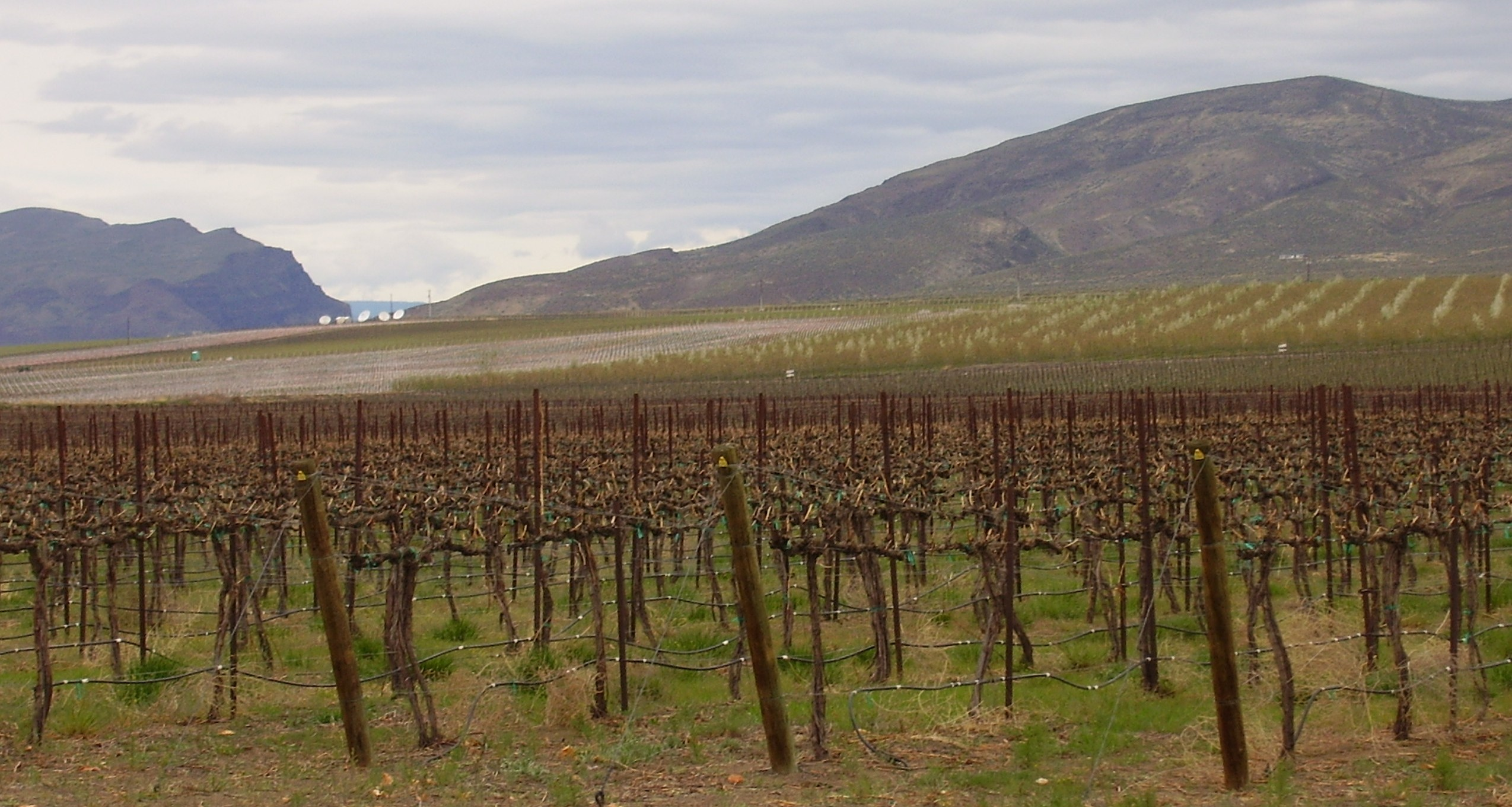
Looking north across Wahluke Slope towards Sentinel Gap

Wahluke Slope is a geographic feature in Grant, Benton and Adams Counties of Eastern Washington. It is a broad, south-facing slope with a grade of about 8%, situated between the Saddle Mountains and the Columbia River's Hanford Reach. It has been described as "basically a 13-mile-wide gravel bar" created by the Glacial Lake Missoula floods at the end of the last ice age about 15,000 years ago. Much of the Slope, part of the Hanford Nuclear Reservation, was added to the Saddle Mountain National Wildlife Refuge in 1999. Much of the remainder is used for viniculture.

== Human use ==
Washington State Route 24 extends from Mattawa, Washington on the western edge of the Slope nearly due east–west. Mattawa is the only population center on the Slope. There was once a town of Wahluke and a Wahluke ferry that crossed the Columbia to the north of White Bluffs. The land was acquired by the U.S. government for the Hanford Nuclear Reservation and the residents, including Wanapum people, ordered to leave in 1943. In two actions in 1953 and 1958 the Atomic Energy Commission returned almost 200,000 acres (810 km^{2}) to public use, mostly for agriculture with irrigation recently provided by Columbia Basin Project sources. Settlement on the Slope by non-Native Americans has been termed as troubled, initially due to lack of water, then later by the Federal Government's land policies, resulting in "sporadic" growth of the town of Mattawa.

=== Nuclear concerns ===
The potential for release of nuclear contaminants into the Slope in the event of a nuclear accident, and the historical atmospheric releases in the ranges of many Curies per month, are of concern to modern authors on Hanford.

=== Viniculture ===
Viniculture is a major agricultural activity on the Slope, with nearly 10,000 acres (40 km^{2}) of vineyards.
