= Wahluke School District =

School district in Washington, United States

Wahluke School District (Public) is a public school district in rural Grant County, Washington, United States, serving the communities of Mattawa and Desert Aire.

As of October 2016, the district has an enrollment of 2,472 students and 139 classroom teachers.

One 60-acre (240,000 m^{2}) campus houses all district facilities. Its district headquarters are located in Mattawa.

== Schools ==
District Superintendent: Andrew Harlow

Director of Finance and Programs: Tracy Plouse

Director of Instruction and Programs: Melissa (Missy) Stevenson

Mattawa Elementary (Pre K - 5)

• Principal: Brandy Ross

• Vice Principal: Amy Marlow

Saddle Mountain Elementary (K - 5)

• Principal: Kurt Hoffman

• Vice Principal: Niki Swanson

Morris Schott Elementary (K - 5)

• Principal: Karl Edie

Wahluke Junior High (6-8)

• Principal: Arturo Lopez

• Vice Principal: Nolan Maggs

Wahluke High School (9-12)

• Principal: Cody Marlow

• Vice Principal: Molly Lawson

Sentinel Tech Alternative School (9-12)

• Principal: DJ Garza

== Student demographics ==
As of October 2016, 2,472 students were enrolled in district. The ethnic breakdown is: 95.8% Hispanic, 3.4% White, and 0.6% American Indian/Alaskan Native.

100+% of students qualify for free or reduced-price meals. 14.1% are enrolled in special education. 59% are transitional bilingual. 29.9% are migrant students.

== Programs and opportunities ==
Some of the programs offered by the district include: agricultural education opportunities, STEM (Science-Technology-Engineering-Math) with fully equipped Woodworking, Welding, and Metal Fabrication Laboratories, over 25 athletic and extra-curricular activities, and extended day programs. The district has also established Bilingual/ESL programs as the majority of students are English language learners.
