= Amanda Thomas =

American seismologist

Amanda M. Thomas is an American observational seismologist known for her study of slow-motion earth movements, on scales from individual landslides to plate boundaries, and their ability to cause earthquakes. She is a professor in the Department of Earth and Planetary Sciences at the University of California, Davis, where she holds the inaugural Louise H. Kellogg Endowed Chair.

== Education and career ==
Thomas majored in civil engineering at Georgia Tech, graduating with highest honors in 2007. She continued her studies in geophysics at the University of California, Berkeley, where she completed her Ph.D. in 2012; her graduate studies also included research as a visiting researcher at Tohoku University in Japan.

She became a postdoctoral researcher at Stanford University from 2013 to 2015, and in 2015 took an assistant professor position at the University of Oregon. She was promoted to associate professor in 2019. In 2025, she moved to the University of California, Davis to take up the inaugural Louise H. Kellogg Endowed Chair.

== Recognition ==
The Seismological Society of America gave Thomas their 2018 Charles F. Richter Early Career Award. She was a 2025 recipient of the Presidential Early Career Award for Scientists and Engineers.
