= Puget Sound Clean Air Agency =

Washington, United States clean air agency

The Puget Sound Clean Air Agency is a local clean air agency that partners with the EPA and the state government to regulate air pollution in Pierce, King, Kitsap, and Snohomish counties in the state of Washington. They are headquartered in Seattle Washington. The agency produces public health reports, permits, and other programs to advance air quality in its district.

== Programs ==
=== Cool school challenge ===
The Cool School Challenge is a program part of the Puget Sound Clean Air Agency, designed to spread climate education and engage students and teachers in reducing the greenhouse gas emissions of their schools. The program also aims to encourage student leadership and empowerment in the process. Most of the schools that have taken on the program are located in the Puget Sound area, however there are various schools from around the United States (and one international school, the American School of Dubai) that have done so as well. The program has reports on their website to have reduced a total of over 2.2 million pounds of carbon.

The program's website lays out a structured approach to guide students who want to Take The Challenge through the process of assessing their school's greenhouse gas emissions and taking action to reduce those emissions. The site also provides a wealth of supplementary resources and materials such as classroom activities and presentations. At the end of the challenge, the website prompts the participant to share their results online.
