= Moxee, Washington =

City in Washington, United States

Moxee
- City
- Location of Moxee, Washington
- Coordinates: 46°33′30″N 120°23′14″W
- Country: United States
- State: Washington
- County: Yakima
- Founded: 1867

Government
  - Type: Mayor–council
  - Mayor: LeRoy Lenseigne

Area
  - Total: 2.37 sq mi (6.13 km^{2})
  - Land: 2.37 sq mi (6.13 km^{2})
  - Water: 0 sq mi (0.00 km^{2})
- Elevation: 1,040 ft (320 m)

Population (2020)
  - Total: 4,326
  - Estimate (2021): 4,405
  - Density: 1,830/sq mi (706/km^{2})
- Time zone: UTC-8 (PST)
  - Summer (DST): UTC-7 (PDT)
- ZIP code: 98936
- Area code: 509
- FIPS code: 53-47665
- GNIS feature ID: 2411188
- Website: cityofmoxee.us

Moxee is a small suburban community southeast of Yakima, Washington. Yakima and Moxee are both north of the Yakama Indian Reservation in Yakima County, Washington, United States. The population of Moxee was 4,326 at the 2020 census.

According to the Washington State Office of Financial Management, Moxee ranked 5th of 279 eligible incorporated communities in population growth between 2000 and 2005.

== History ==
Moxee was first settled by Mortimer Thorp and several French-Canadian farmers who arrived in 1867. A warm spring on the Thorp ranch emitted steam year round and never froze. It was known as "Moxee" by the native people, a Sahaptin word for an edible root, and the name was adopted for the settlement. Over time, the community has been variously known as: "Artesian", "Moksee", "Moxie", "Moxee City", and "Moxee."

The sandy soil and mild climate of the region were ideal for growing hops used in the brewing of beer, and for growing grapes. By the turn of the century, the Northern Pacific Railroad had completed a railway line nearby and irrigation projects were being constructed making rich farmland available to new settlers. This attracted more French and French-Canadian farmers who had first immigrated to northern Minnesota and northern Michigan. A French school was established on La Framboise Road and masses at Holy Rosary Parish were said in French up to World War I.

The town of Moxee City was incorporated on April 27, 1921. Street and road names in the vicinity, such as Charron, Faucher, Rivard, Beaudry, Desmarais, Robillard, Beauchene, Gamache, Champoux, Morrier, and St. Hilaire, continue to reflect Moxee's French-Canadian heritage. However, almost one-third of residents are of Hispanic descent today.

In 2016, several homes near Moxie were evacuated because of the Range 12 fire, which ultimately destroyed over tens-of-thousands of acres in Yakima County.

== Geography ==
According to the United States Census Bureau, the city has a total area of 1.69 square miles (4.38 km^{2}), all of it land.

=== Climate ===
According to the Köppen Climate Classification system, Moxee has a semi-arid climate, abbreviated "BSk" on climate maps.

Climate data for Moxee (1991–2020 normals, extremes 1946–2018)
| Month | Jan | Feb | Mar | Apr | May | Jun | Jul | Aug | Sep | Oct | Nov | Dec | Year |
|---|---|---|---|---|---|---|---|---|---|---|---|---|---|
| Record high °F (°C) | 65 (18) | 68 (20) | 76 (24) | 87 (31) | 99 (37) | 104 (40) | 105 (41) | 108 (42) | 98 (37) | 88 (31) | 72 (22) | 61 (16) | 108 (42) |
| Mean maximum °F (°C) | 53.8 (12.1) | 57.6 (14.2) | 67.9 (19.9) | 77.2 (25.1) | 86.9 (30.5) | 92.4 (33.6) | 99.1 (37.3) | 97.4 (36.3) | 90.2 (32.3) | 76.7 (24.8) | 61.6 (16.4) | 52.6 (11.4) | 100.3 (37.9) |
| Mean daily maximum °F (°C) | 37.8 (3.2) | 45.0 (7.2) | 54.3 (12.4) | 62.3 (16.8) | 71.9 (22.2) | 78.8 (26.0) | 88.0 (31.1) | 86.7 (30.4) | 77.4 (25.2) | 62.3 (16.8) | 47.2 (8.4) | 36.8 (2.7) | 62.4 (16.9) |
| Daily mean °F (°C) | 31.3 (−0.4) | 36.1 (2.3) | 42.8 (6.0) | 49.0 (9.4) | 57.3 (14.1) | 63.7 (17.6) | 71.1 (21.7) | 70.1 (21.2) | 62.1 (16.7) | 50.0 (10.0) | 38.4 (3.6) | 30.5 (−0.8) | 50.2 (10.1) |
| Mean daily minimum °F (°C) | 24.8 (−4.0) | 27.2 (−2.7) | 31.2 (−0.4) | 35.7 (2.1) | 42.8 (6.0) | 48.5 (9.2) | 54.2 (12.3) | 53.5 (11.9) | 46.8 (8.2) | 37.7 (3.2) | 29.7 (−1.3) | 24.2 (−4.3) | 38.0 (3.3) |
| Mean minimum °F (°C) | 8.8 (−12.9) | 14.3 (−9.8) | 20.1 (−6.6) | 24.4 (−4.2) | 29.9 (−1.2) | 37.0 (2.8) | 43.0 (6.1) | 43.1 (6.2) | 34.5 (1.4) | 24.0 (−4.4) | 14.9 (−9.5) | 8.6 (−13.0) | 2.8 (−16.2) |
| Record low °F (°C) | −21 (−29) | −20 (−29) | 3 (−16) | 18 (−8) | 19 (−7) | 28 (−2) | 29 (−2) | 32 (0) | 24 (−4) | 8 (−13) | −7 (−22) | −23 (−31) | −23 (−31) |
| Average precipitation inches (mm) | 0.94 (24) | 0.62 (16) | 0.61 (15) | 0.74 (19) | 0.86 (22) | 0.63 (16) | 0.22 (5.6) | 0.18 (4.6) | 0.29 (7.4) | 0.83 (21) | 0.84 (21) | 1.08 (27) | 7.84 (199) |
| Average snowfall inches (cm) | 3.2 (8.1) | 1.2 (3.0) | 0.4 (1.0) | 0.0 (0.0) | 0.0 (0.0) | 0.0 (0.0) | 0.0 (0.0) | 0.0 (0.0) | 0.0 (0.0) | 0.0 (0.0) | 1.7 (4.3) | 3.4 (8.6) | 9.9 (25) |
| Average precipitation days (≥ 0.01 in) | 6.7 | 5.4 | 5.0 | 4.7 | 5.8 | 4.0 | 1.8 | 1.8 | 2.6 | 6.1 | 6.8 | 7.9 | 58.6 |
| Average snowy days (≥ 0.1 in) | 2.3 | 0.7 | 0.3 | 0.0 | 0.0 | 0.0 | 0.0 | 0.0 | 0.0 | 0.0 | 0.7 | 2.9 | 6.9 |
Source 1: NOAA
Source 2: WRCC

== Demographics ==
Historical population
| Census | Pop. | Note | %± |
|---|---|---|---|
| 1930 | 283 | | — |
| 1940 | 335 | | 18.4% |
| 1950 | 543 | | 62.1% |
| 1960 | 499 | | −8.1% |
| 1970 | 600 | | 20.2% |
| 1980 | 687 | | 14.5% |
| 1990 | 814 | | 18.5% |
| 2000 | 821 | | 0.9% |
| 2010 | 3,308 | | 302.9% |
| 2020 | 4,326 | | 30.8% |
| 2021 (est.) | 4,405 | | 1.8% |
U.S. Decennial Census; 2020 Census

=== 2020 census ===
As of the 2020 census, Moxee had a population of 4,326. The median age was 30.7 years. 32.1% of residents were under the age of 18 and 8.5% of residents were 65 years of age or older. For every 100 females there were 95.0 males, and for every 100 females age 18 and over there were 94.3 males age 18 and over.

0.0% of residents lived in urban areas, while 100.0% lived in rural areas.

There were 1,324 households in Moxee, of which 55.6% had children under the age of 18 living in them. Of all households, 58.2% were married-couple households, 14.2% were households with a male householder and no spouse or partner present, and 18.7% were households with a female householder and no spouse or partner present. About 12.9% of all households were made up of individuals and 6.6% had someone living alone who was 65 years of age or older.

There were 1,360 housing units, of which 2.6% were vacant. The homeowner vacancy rate was 0.5% and the rental vacancy rate was 3.3%.

Racial composition as of the 2020 census
| Race | Number | Percent |
|---|---|---|
| White | 2,341 | 54.1% |
| Black or African American | 43 | 1.0% |
| American Indian and Alaska Native | 94 | 2.2% |
| Asian | 59 | 1.4% |
| Native Hawaiian and Other Pacific Islander | 10 | 0.2% |
| Some other race | 1,088 | 25.2% |
| Two or more races | 691 | 16.0% |
| Hispanic or Latino (of any race) | 1,977 | 45.7% |

=== 2010 census ===
As of the 2010 census, there were 3,308 people, 1,014 households, and 809 families residing in the city. The population density was 1,957.4 inhabitants per square mile (755.8/km^{2}). There were 1,032 housing units at an average density of 610.7 per square mile (235.8/km^{2}). The racial makeup of the city was 70.9% White, 0.6% African American, 2.3% Native American, 1.2% Asian, 21.2% from other races, and 3.8% from two or more races. Hispanic or Latino of any race were 39.0% of the population.

There were 1,014 households, of which 57.2% had children under the age of 18 living with them, 56.5% were married couples living together, 15.1% had a female householder with no husband present, 8.2% had a male householder with no wife present, and 20.2% were non-families. 15.5% of all households were made up of individuals, and 4.9% had someone living alone who was 65 years of age or older. The average household size was 3.26 and the average family size was 3.59.

The median age in the city was 27.7 years. 36.5% of residents were under the age of 18; 9.3% were between the ages of 18 and 24; 32.4% were from 25 to 44; 16.4% were from 45 to 64; and 5.3% were 65 years of age or older. The gender makeup of the city was 49.5% male and 50.5% female.

=== 2000 census ===
As of the 2000 census, there were 821 people, 292 households, and 202 families residing in the city. The population density was 697.3 people per square mile (268.6/km^{2}). There were 307 housing units at an average density of 260.8 per square mile (100.5/km^{2}). The racial makeup of the city was 66.99% White, 0.73% African American, 1.58% Native American, 0.49% Asian, 27.65% from other races, and 2.56% from two or more races. Hispanic or Latino of any race were 31.79% of the population.

There were 192 households, out of which 39.7% had children under the age of 18 living with them, 55.1% were married couples living together, 9.6% had a female householder with no husband present, and 30.5% were non-families. 28.1% of all households were made up of individuals, and 15.4% had someone living alone who was 65 years of age or older. The average household size was 2.80 and the average family size was 3.48.

In the city, the age distribution of the population shows 33.3% under the age of 18, 7.1% from 18 to 24, 30.9% from 25 to 44, 18.4% from 45 to 64, and 10.4% who were 65 years of age or older. The median age was 32 years. For every 100 females, there were 99.8 males. For every 100 females age 18 and over, there were 94.3 males.

The median income for a household in the city was $32,500, and the median income for a family was $40,500. Males had a median income of $35,667 versus $20,313 for females. The per capita income for the city was $14,176. About 7.8% of families and 12.2% of the population were below the poverty line, including 11.8% of those under age 18 and 9.6% of those age 65 or over.

== Notable people ==
- Jeremiah Green (1977–2022), musician
