= Hanford, Washington =

Ghost town in Washington (state)

- Ghost town
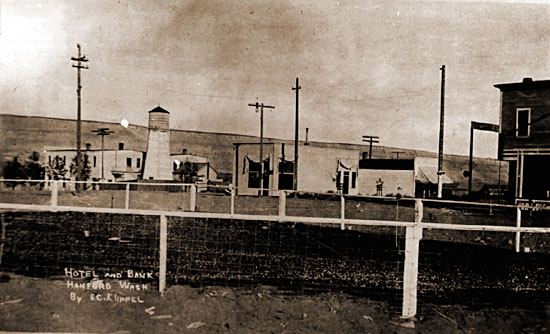
- Main street in Hanford, 1915

- Location within Benton County, Washington
- Coordinates: 46°35′01″N 119°23′16″W
- Country: United States
- State: Washington
- County: Benton
- Settled: 1907
- Elevation: 404 ft (123 m)
- Time zone: UTC-8 (Pacific (PST))
  - Summer (DST): UTC-7 (PDT)
- ZIP code: 99343
- Area code: 509

Hanford was a small agricultural community in Benton County, Washington, United States. It and White Bluffs were depopulated in 1943 in order to make room for the nuclear production facility known as the Hanford Site. The town was located in what is now the "100F" sector of the site.

The original town, named for the judge and irrigation company president Cornelius H. Hanford, was settled in 1907 on land bought by the local power and water utility. In 1913, the town had a spur railroad link to the transcontinental Chicago, Milwaukee and St. Paul Railway, also known as "the electric railroad". By 1925 the booming town enjoyed high agricultural demand and provided a hotel, bank, and elementary and high schools.

The federal government condemned Hanford to make way for the Hanford Site. Residents were given a thirty-day eviction notice on March 9, 1943. Most buildings were razed, with the exception of the former Hanford High School. It was used during World War II as the construction management office.

Hanford High School, albeit marred from SWAT practice, still stands today and can be seen from the Hanford tour bus operated by the U.S. government. Hanford is now protected as part of the Manhattan Project National Historical Park.

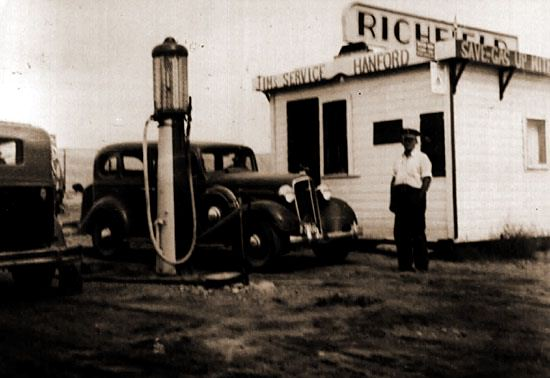
Service station in Hanford, 1930

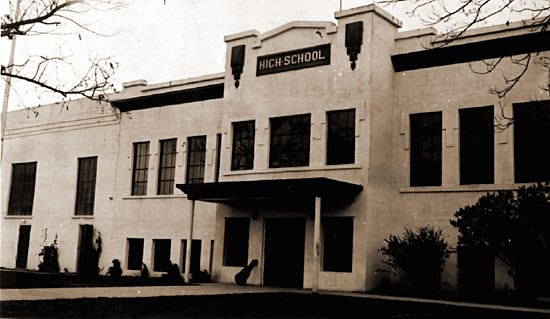
Hanford High School, 1925

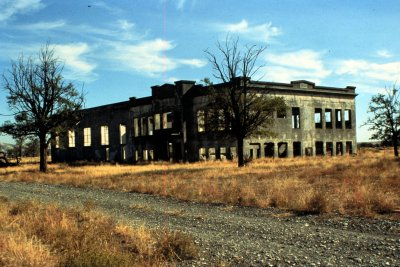
Hanford High School, following its use for military training

== See also ==
- List of ghost towns in Washington
