= White Bluffs, Washington =

Ghost town in Washington (state)

- Ghost town
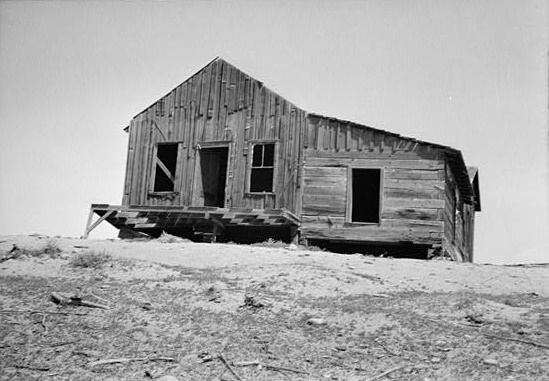
- Remains of the Hudson's Bay Company post at White Bluffs, ca. 1937

- Location within Benton County, Washington
- Coordinates: 46°39′59″N 119°29′05″W
- Country: United States
- State: Washington
- County: Benton
- Elevation: 413 ft (126 m)
- Time zone: UTC-8 (Pacific (PST))
  - Summer (DST): UTC-7 (PDT)
- ZIP code: 98944
- Area code: 509
- GNIS feature ID: 1531180

White Bluffs was an agricultural town in Benton County, Washington, United States. It was depopulated in 1943 along with the town of Hanford to make room for the nuclear production facility known as the Hanford Site.

== History ==
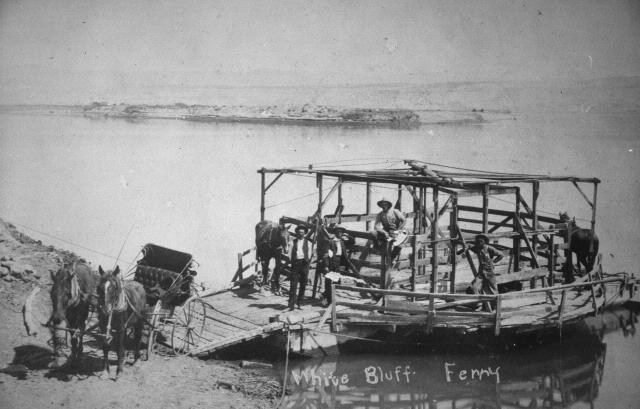
The horse-powered ferry at White Bluffs ca. 1909

Prior to the arrival of white settlers, the land was inhabited by the Wanapum Indians, a tribe closely related to the Palouse, Yakama, and Nez Perce tribes.

The first white settlement at White Bluffs was in 1861. The original townsite was located on the east bank of the Columbia River in Franklin County, near present-day Area 100H of the Hanford Nuclear Reservation. A ferry was built to accommodate traffic across the Columbia headed for the gold rush in British Columbia. By the early 1890s the population had grown and the town expanded to the west bank of the Columbia in Benton County.

The state government authorized a "colonization" project in 1921 to build 99 homes for returning World War I veterans, but abandoned it in 1925.

=== Hanford Site ===
When U.S. government seizures of homes of White Bluffs residents occurred beginning in March 1943, some homes were seized immediately for government office buildings. Residents were given from three days to two months to abandon their homes. Homes and orchards were burned by the government to clear the site. The remains of some 177 persons buried at the White Bluffs Cemetery were moved on May 6, 1943, to the East Prosser Cemetery, some 30 miles (50 km) away.

At the time of the government destruction of the town of White Bluffs, production of pears, apples, vegetables, and grapes for wine production were primary sources of livelihood.

Almost nothing remains of the town. A U.S. Department of Energy photo gallery containing various White Bluffs pictures was released on June 15, 2008.

== See also ==
- List of ghost towns in Washington
