= Hanford Reach National Monument =

National monument in the United States

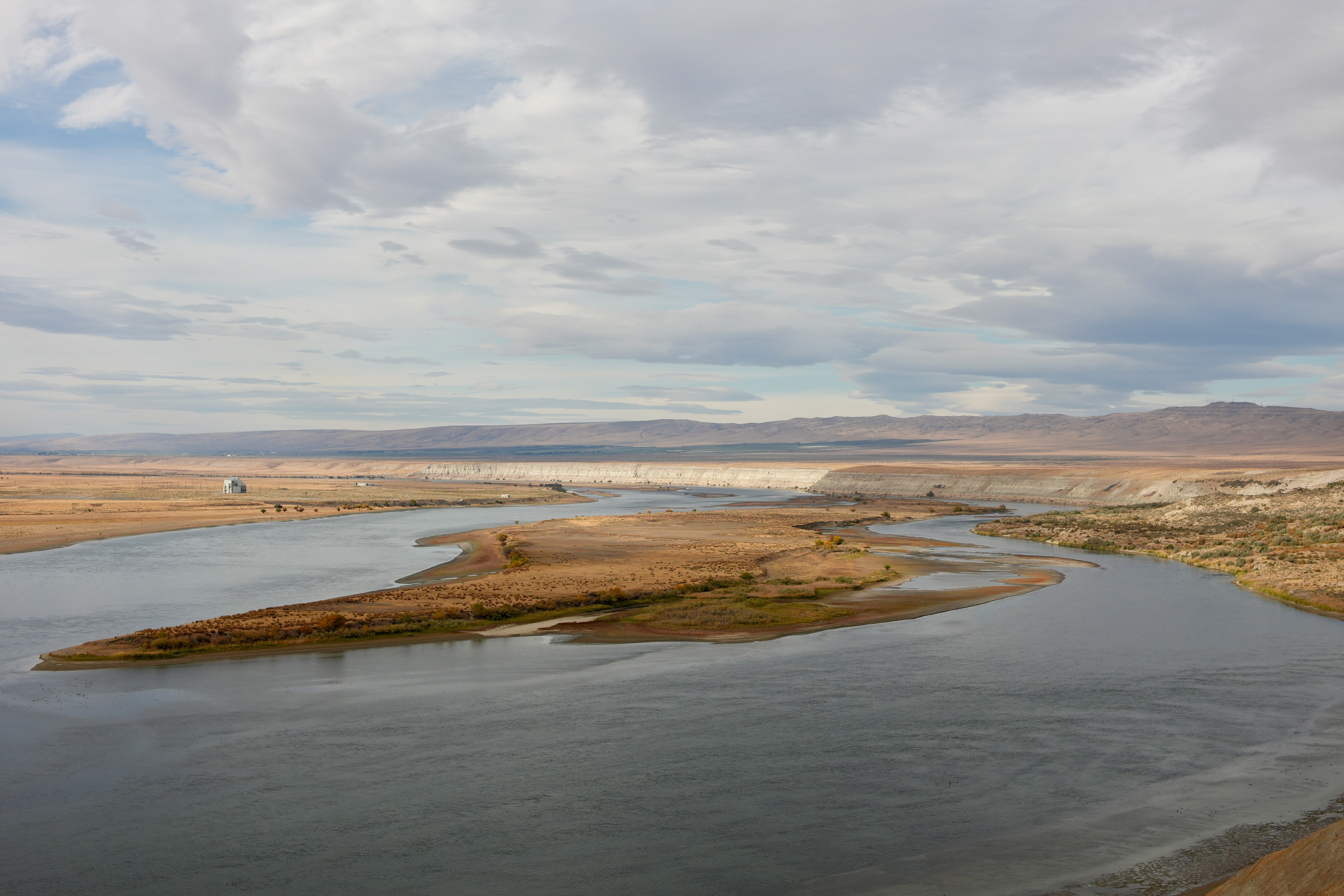
- Columbia River bend in Hanford Reach National Monument with H Reactor in the distance

- Location within Washington (state) Location within the United States
- Interactive map of Hanford Reach National Monument
- Location: Benton / Grant / Franklin / Adams counties, Washington, USA
- Nearest city: Richland, WA
- Coordinates: 46°35′00″N 119°31′00″W
- Area: 194,451 acres (78,692 ha)
- Created: June 8, 2000
- Governing body: U.S. Fish and Wildlife Service U.S. Department of Energy
- Website: Hanford Reach National Monument

U.S. National Monument

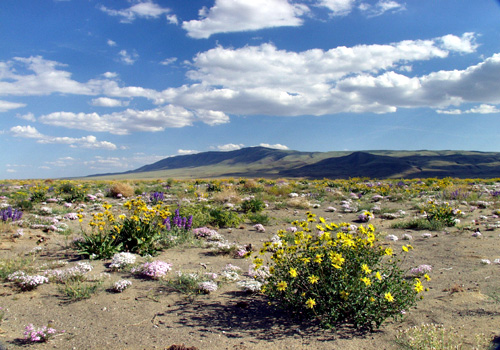
Wildflowers at HRNM

The Hanford Reach National Monument is a national monument in the U.S. state of Washington. It was created in 2000, mostly from the former security buffer surrounding the Hanford Nuclear Reservation. The area has been untouched by development or agriculture since 1943. For this reason, it is considered an involuntary park.

The monument is named after the Hanford Reach, the last non-tidal, free-flowing section of the Columbia River in the United States, and is one of eight national monuments administered by the U. S. Fish and Wildlife Service; part of the monument within the Hanford Site is also managed by the Department of Energy. President Bill Clinton established the monument by presidential decree in 2000. In May 2017, the Interior Department announced that Hanford Reach was one of 27 national monuments under review for possible rescinding of their designation.

Ancestors of the Wanapum People, Yakama Nation, Confederated Tribes of the Colville, Confederated Tribes of the Umatilla Reservation and the Nez Perce used the land for hunting and resource collecting.

Geographically, the area is part of the Columbia River Plateau, formed by basalt lava flows and water erosion. The shrub-steppe landscape is harsh and dry, receiving between 5 and 10 inches (250 mm) of rain per year. The sagebrush-bitterbrush-bunchgrass lands are home to a wide variety of plants and animals, and the Hanford Reach provides one of the northwest's best salmon spawning grounds. Forty-eight rare, threatened, or endangered animal species have found refuge on the monument, as well as several insect species found nowhere else in the world.

== Fish and wildlife ==
There are two main habitats in the Hanford Reach National Monument: desert and river.

Islands, riffles, gravel bars, oxbow ponds and backwater sloughs provide support to forty-three species of fish. Large numbers of fall Chinook salmon spawn in the Hanford reach. Federally threatened species such as the Upper Columbia River Spring Chinook, the Middle Columbia River Steelhead and the Upper Columbia River Steelhead use the reach for migration purposes.

The refuge is famous for the elk located on the Arid Lands Ecology Area. Herd numbers vary by time of year with 150 seen during the spring/summer and 350 to 375 during the fall. The elk population reaches its peak in the winter with an average of 670. Archaeologists believed the elk had been in the region for the last 10,000 years. During the mid-19th century, first hand accounts mentioned the disappearance of the species. Rocky Mountain elk were reintroduced into the region during the 1930s, as well as a natural recolonization event from the nearby cascade mountains during the difficult 1978 winter.

The dry, desert region is home to forty-two mammal species. Mice are the most abundant and include the deer mouse, western harvest mouse, northern grasshopper mouse. Mammals that inhabit this refuge include coyotes, skunks, beavers, mule deer, bobcats, river otters, minks, cougars and badgers.

== Access ==
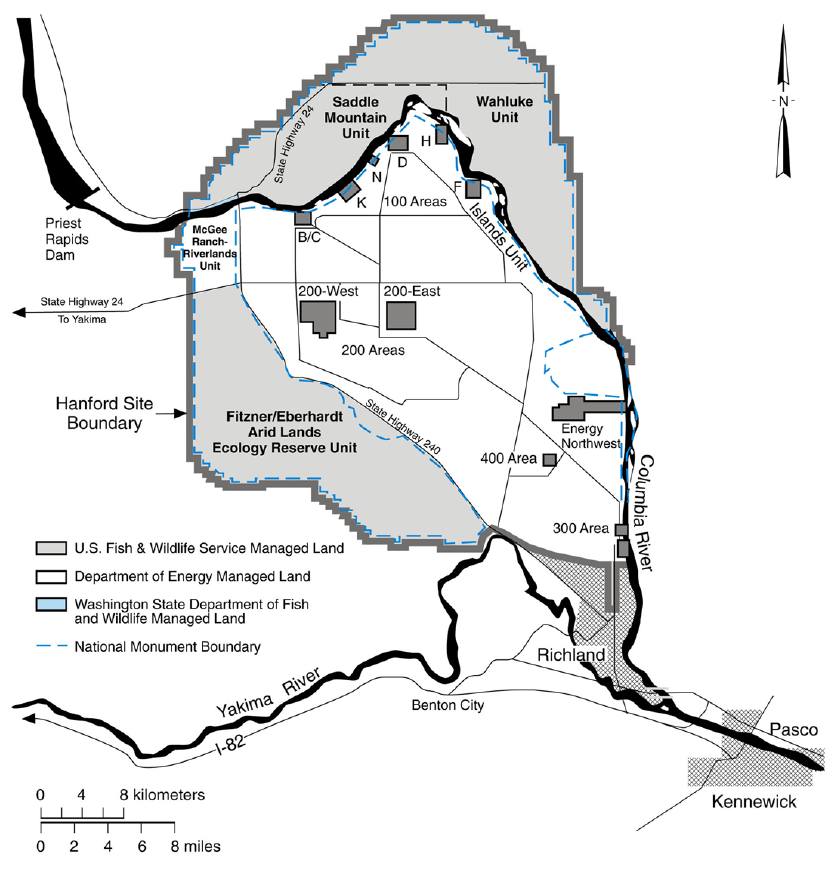
Map of Hanford Reach National Monument

The monument is open from two hours before sunrise to two hours after sunset; some areas are open to the public and others are not:

- Fitzner-Eberhardt Arid Lands Ecology Reserve – access permitted for ecological research, closed to the public.
  - Rattlesnake Mountain is partially within the reserve, and the FWS is undergoing a Congressionally-ordered process to allow limited access to it.
- Columbia River Corridor – shore and open water is generally open to the public.
- McGee Ranch and Riverlands – public day use.
- Saddle Mountain National Wildlife Refuge, located at 46°41′18″N 119°37′39″W.
- Vernita Bridge – open to the public.
- Wahluke Slope – open to the public.

Several sites in the adjacent Hanford Site including the B Reactor are part of the Manhattan Project National Historical Park and are accessible on public tours.

== See also ==
- List of national monuments of the United States
