= Arid Lands Ecology Reserve =

Shrub-steppe ecosystem in Washington, US

Coordinates: 46°41′16″N 119°37′45″W

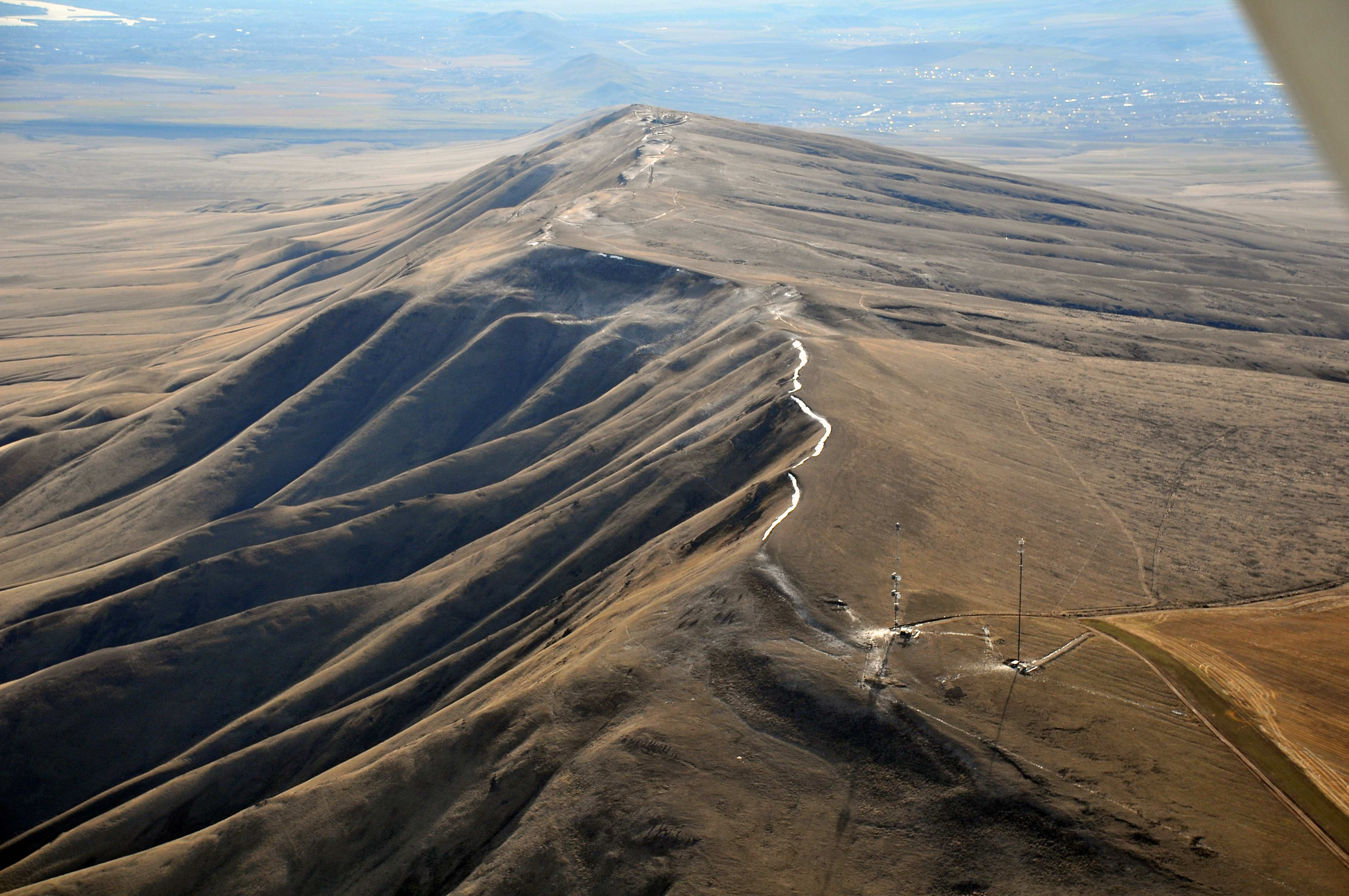
Arid Lands Ecology Reserve

The Arid Land Ecology Reserve (ALE) is the largest tract of shrub-steppe ecosystem remaining in the U.S. state of Washington. It is managed for the U.S. Department of Energy by the Pacific Northwest National Laboratory (which is operated for the U.S. Department of Energy by Battelle Memorial Institute). The 320 km² area is a portion of the 1500 km² National Environmental Research Park located on the Hanford Site on the northwest boundary of Richland, Washington.

On June 27, 2000, a range fire destroyed most of the native sagebrush and bunchgrass as well as damaged the microbiotic crust. Though the US Fish and Wildlife Service has attempted to re-introduce native flora, the Arid Lands Ecology Reserve is currently dominated by non-native species such as cheatgrass, knapweeds, and Russian thistle (tumbleweed) which flourished after the 2000 fire. Other species such as spiny hop sage and Wyoming big sagebrush were decimated by the fire and in its aftermath.

== Vegetation ==
=== Shrub-steppe ===
This vegetation type describes plant communities found in and around arid mountains, ridges and slopes. In the ALE this includes shrubs (sagebrush and rabbit brush), perennial bunchgrasses (Sandberg's blue grass and bluebunch wheat grass) as well as both annual and perennial forbs (balsamroot, phlox and fleabane).

=== Riparian ===
This vegetation type refers to plant communities located around springs and streamflow. In the ALE these areas are dominated by willow, black cottonwood, chokecherry, and mock Orange.

== Point of interest ==
The north-facing slope of Rattlesnake Mountain is the highest “treeless” mountain in the United States.

Rare plant species such as Mountain Milk Vetch and Piper's daisy can be found in this area.

== History ==
From the early 1800s to around the 1940s this area was used as animal pasture, human homesteading, oil drilling and development of infrastructure such as roads. In 1943 the United States Department of Energy (DOE) gained ownership of the land. The ALE was then established in 1967 with the intended purpose of plant conservation. It gained natural area research designation in 1971 and later national environmental research park status in 1975. Currently, the U.S. Fish and Wildlife Service have handled land management through permits with the DOE, while the DOE maintain administrative powers over the land and any associated roads, this has been in effect since 1997. Finally, in 2000 it was amalgamated into the Hanford Reach National Monument.

== See also ==
- Arid Forest Research Institute
