= Mattawa, Washington =

City in Washington, United States

Mattawa
- City
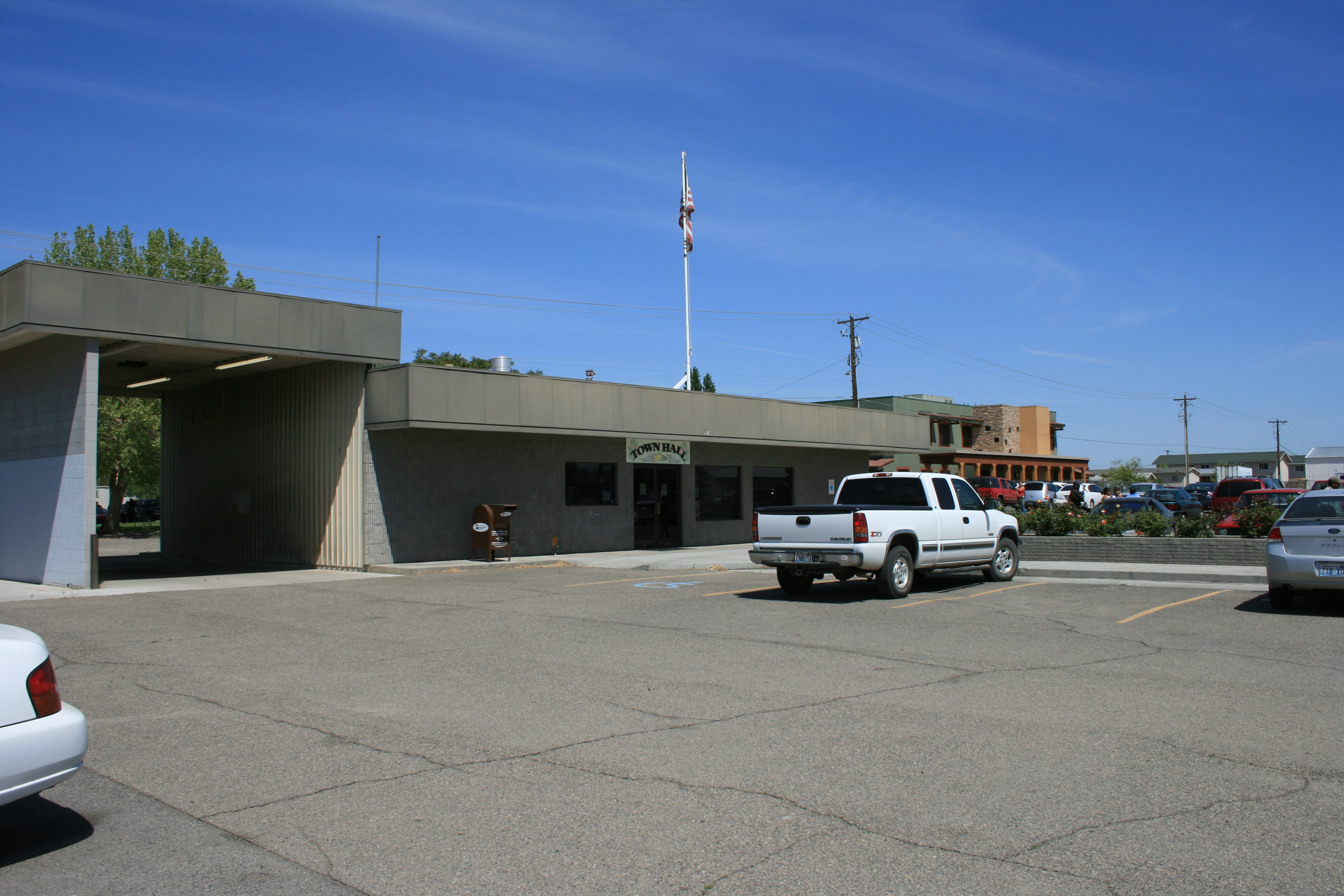
- Mattawa City Hall (2008)

- Location of Mattawa, Washington
- Coordinates: 46°44′15″N 119°53′21″W
- Country: United States
- State: Washington
- County: Grant

Government
  - Type: Mayor–council
  - Mayor: Maria M. Celaya

Area
  - Total: 0.92 sq mi (2.39 km^{2})
  - Land: 0.92 sq mi (2.39 km^{2})
  - Water: 0 sq mi (0.00 km^{2})
- Elevation: 755 ft (230 m)

Population (2020)
  - Total: 3,335
  - Estimate (2021): 3,627
  - Density: 5,159.3/sq mi (1,992.03/km^{2})
- Time zone: UTC-8 (PST)
  - Summer (DST): UTC-7 (PDT)
- ZIP code: 99349
- Area code: 509
- FIPS code: 53-44165
- GNIS feature ID: 2412963
- Website: cityofmattawa.com

Mattawa is an incorporated city in Grant County, Washington, United States. The population was 3,335 at the 2020 census.

== History ==
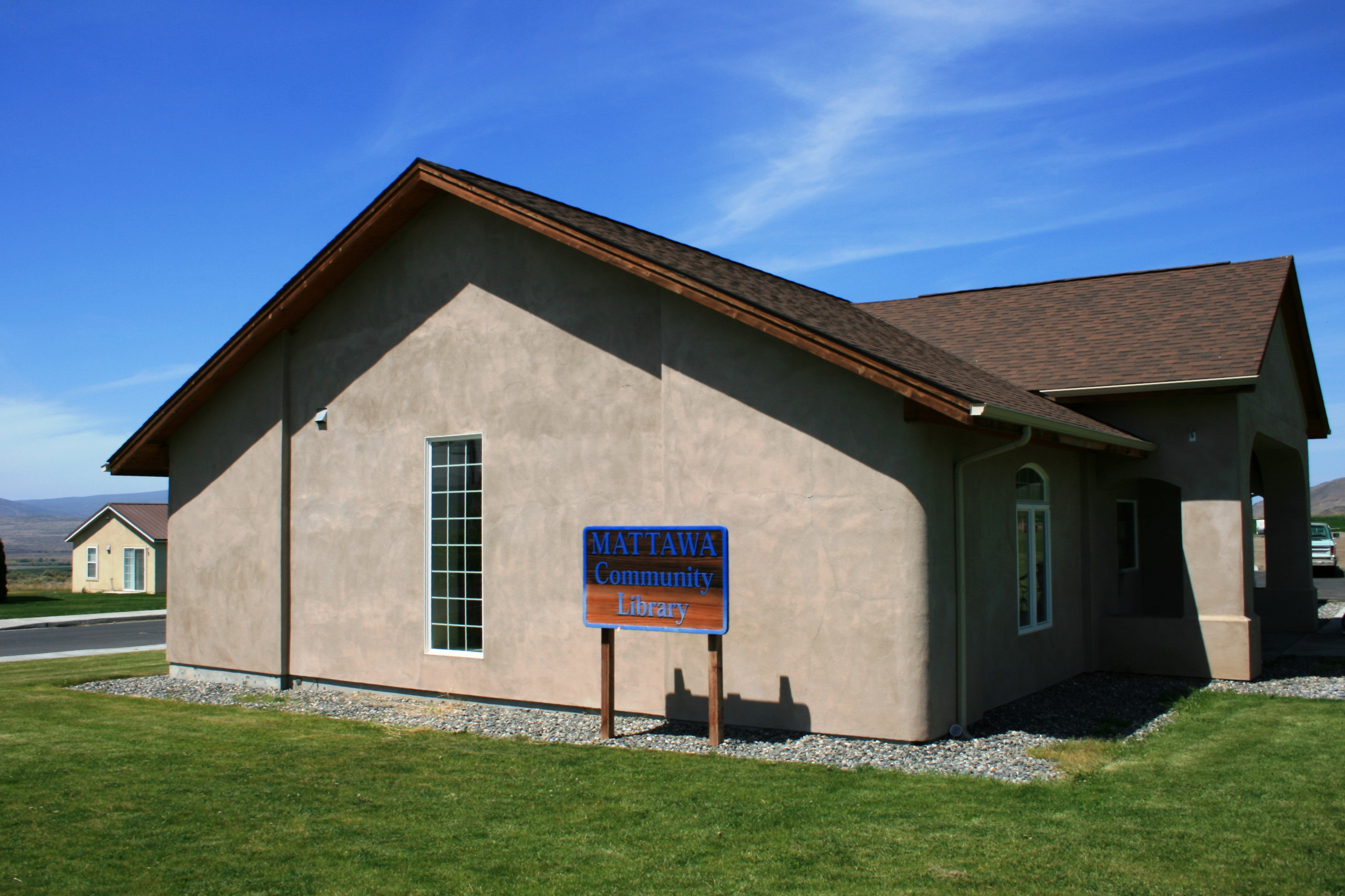
Exterior view of straw bale library in Mattawa, Washington taken in 2008 (constructed 2002 by IronStraw Group).

The town of Mattawa was originally platted in 1909 by E. and Eva Campbell, but was not incorporated at that time. With the construction of nearby Priest Rapids Dam and Wanapum Dam, the town boomed with construction workers. Mattawa was officially incorporated on June 3, 1958. The Port of Mattawa was also established in 1958. Mattawa is also home to the first straw bale library in the United States. On December 3, 2009, the City of Mattawa became a non-charter code city.

== Geography ==
According to the United States Census Bureau, the town has a total area of 0.74 square miles (1.92 km^{2}), all of it land.

=== Climate ===
According to the Köppen Climate Classification system, Mattawa has a semi-arid climate, abbreviated "BSk" on climate maps.

== Demographics ==
Historical population
Census	Pop.	Note	%±
1960	394		—
1970	180		−54.3%
1980	299		66.1%
1990	941		214.7%
2000	2,609		177.3%
2010	4,437		70.1%
2020	3,335		−24.8%
2021 (est.)	3,627		8.8%
U.S. Decennial Census; 2020 Census

The Mattawa Police Department (MAPD) currently consists of a police chief and four full-time, fully commissioned general-authority Washington police officers.

Mattawa is served by the Wahluke School District.

=== 2020 census ===
As of the 2020 census, Mattawa had a population of 3,335 and a median age of 23.0 years. 41.8% of residents were under the age of 18 and 3.4% of residents were 65 years of age or older.

For every 100 females there were 110.3 males, and for every 100 females age 18 and over there were 110.7 males age 18 and over.

0.0% of residents lived in urban areas, while 100.0% lived in rural areas.

There were 761 households in Mattawa, of which 71.5% had children under the age of 18 living in them. Of all households, 56.5% were married-couple households, 15.9% were households with a male householder and no spouse or partner present, and 20.2% were households with a female householder and no spouse or partner present. About 6.8% of all households were made up of individuals and 2.4% had someone living alone who was 65 years of age or older.

There were 819 housing units, of which 7.1% were vacant. The homeowner vacancy rate was 0.0% and the rental vacancy rate was 2.6%.

Racial composition as of the 2020 census
Race	Number	Percent
White	368	11.0%
Black or African American	19	0.6%
American Indian and Alaska Native	47	1.4%
Asian	4	0.1%
Native Hawaiian and Other Pacific Islander	2	0.1%
Some other race	2,276	68.2%
Two or more races	619	18.6%
Hispanic or Latino (of any race)	3,220	96.6%

=== 2010 census ===
As of the 2010 census, there were 4,437 people, 791 households, and 725 families residing in the town. The population density was 5,995.9 inhabitants per square mile (2,315.0/km^{2}). There were 843 housing units at an average density of 1,139.2 per square mile (439.8/km^{2}). The racial makeup of the town was 45.0% White, 0.9% African American, 1.1% Native American, 0.1% Asian, 49.7% from other races, and 3.4% from two or more races. Hispanic or Latino of any race were 95.7% of the population.

There were 791 households, of which 82.8% had children under the age of 18 living with them, 70.7% were married couples living together, 10.6% had a female householder with no husband present, 10.4% had a male householder with no wife present, and 8.3% were non-families. 2.3% of all households were made up of individuals, and 0.6% had someone living alone who was 65 years of age or older. The average household size was 5.61 and the average family size was 5.28.

The median age in the town was 22 years. 42% of residents were under the age of 18; 14.3% were between the ages of 18 and 24; 33.1% were from 25 to 44; 8.7% were from 45 to 64; and 1.8% were 65 years of age or older. The gender makeup of the town was 55.7% male and 44.3% female.

=== 2000 census ===
As of the 2000 census, there were 2,609 people, 495 households, and 438 families residing in the town. The population density was 5,281.7 people per square mile (2,055.8/km^{2}). There were 576 housing units at an average density of 1,166.1 per square mile (453.9/km^{2}). The racial makeup of the town was 29.59% White, 0.19% African American, 0.54% Native American, 0.92% Asian, 65.85% from other races, and 2.91% from two or more races. Hispanic or Latino of any race were 89.80% of the population.

There were 495 households, out of which 66.7% had children under the age of 18 living with them, 64.2% were married couples living together, 10.7% had a female householder with no husband present, and 11.5% were non-families. 5.5% of all households were made up of individuals, and 2.0% had someone living alone who was 65 years of age or older. The average household size was 5.27 and the average family size was 4.79.

In the city, the population was spread out, with 38.1% under the age of 18, 20.4% from 18 to 24, 32.4% from 25 to 44, 7.6% from 45 to 64, and 1.5% who were 65 years of age or older. The median age was 22 years. For every 100 females, there were 151.8 males. For every 100 females age 18 and over, there were 179.2 males.

The median income for a household in the town was $31,964, and the median income for a family was $25,921. Males had a median income of $13,669 versus $13,333 for females. The per capita income for the city was $7,510. About 30.6% of families and 34.4% of the population were below the poverty line, including 38.0% of those under age 18 and 42.6% of those age 65 or over.

== Education ==
The city is served by the Wahluke School District.
