= Priest Rapids Lake =

- Location within Washington (state) Location within the United States
- Location: Grant / Yakima / Kittitas counties, Washington, US
- Coordinates: 46°38′35″N 119°54′34″W
- Type: reservoir
- Primary inflows: Columbia River
- Primary outflows: Columbia River
- Basin countries: United States

Priest Rapids Lake is a reservoir on the Columbia River in the U.S. state of Washington. It was created in 1959 with the construction of Priest Rapids Dam. The reservoir stretches from there upstream to the Wanapum Dam.

== See also ==
- List of dams in the Columbia River watershed
