= Vanport Library =

Former library in Vanport, Oregon, open from 1943 to 1948

General information
- Location: Vanport City, United States

The Vanport Library served the short-lived community of Vanport, Oregon from August 3, 1943 until the city was flooded in 1948. It had 2,500 books upon opening, 1,000 of which were loaned from Portland's Central Library.

Vanport, then the largest federal housing project, was the only one with its own library. The library had a brick veneer, many windows, and a green lawn, and was sited two blocks from the city center. It was designed by Wolff & Phillips and built by Wegman & Son, and its floor plan was similar to the Beaumont Library.

Its federal funding was considered ample to fill its capacity for about 5,000 books. The library was considered an important educational resource; although Vanport had five public schools, it lacked a high school, relying instead on nearby Portland's school system for secondary education.

In the library's first weeks, more than 800 library cards were requested, and its holdings were widely used. Westerns and light fiction were popular, as were technical books and information relating to doing business in Oregon; the residents of the housing project had for the most part recently arrived from all over the United States. It was customary for libraries to require local references prior to dispensing library cards, but since the majority of applicants lacked local references, a hasty decision was made to dispense with that custom.

Because the Library Association of Portland was in charge of all libraries in Multnomah County, the branch was operated as though it were part of that system, with the expectation that its stewardship would transfer to the PLA after the end of World War II (which was the reason for Vanport's inception).

The library was open at various hours, to accommodate the shift work schedules associated with Vanport's shipbuilding industry. It functioned as a community center for a city with new residents from many different parts of the United States.

When the city of Vanport was washed out by a flood on Memorial Day in 1948, the library was washed out, and considered a "total loss." At the time, it had 7,000 books.
