= Columbia Data Center =

- Location within Washington (state)

General information
- Type: Data center
- Location: Quincy, Washington, United States
- Coordinates: 47.24°N 119.86°W
- Completed: 2007
- Owner: Microsoft

Technical details
- Floor area: 800,000 sq ft (74,000 m^{2}) (2015)
- Grounds: 270 acres (110 ha) (2016)

Columbia Data Center is Microsoft's data center in Quincy, Washington. Property at Quincy was purchased in 2006; the building opened in April, 2007; and the data center reached operational status in May, 2007. It was said to be the largest data center in the world as of 2015. The company located there due to low land costs, abundant data fiber, and extremely low cost electricity provided by Grant County PUD for as little as 1.9 or 2.5 cents per kilowatt-hour. Building began with a 500,000-square-foot (46,000 m^{2}) facility in 2006 and several expansions followed, occupying with 800,000 square feet (74,000 m^{2}) of floorspace in two buildings on a 270-acre (110 ha) complex by 2016. The data center consumed 30 to 50 megawatts in 2012 and employs 50 people.
