= Quincy, Washington =

- City
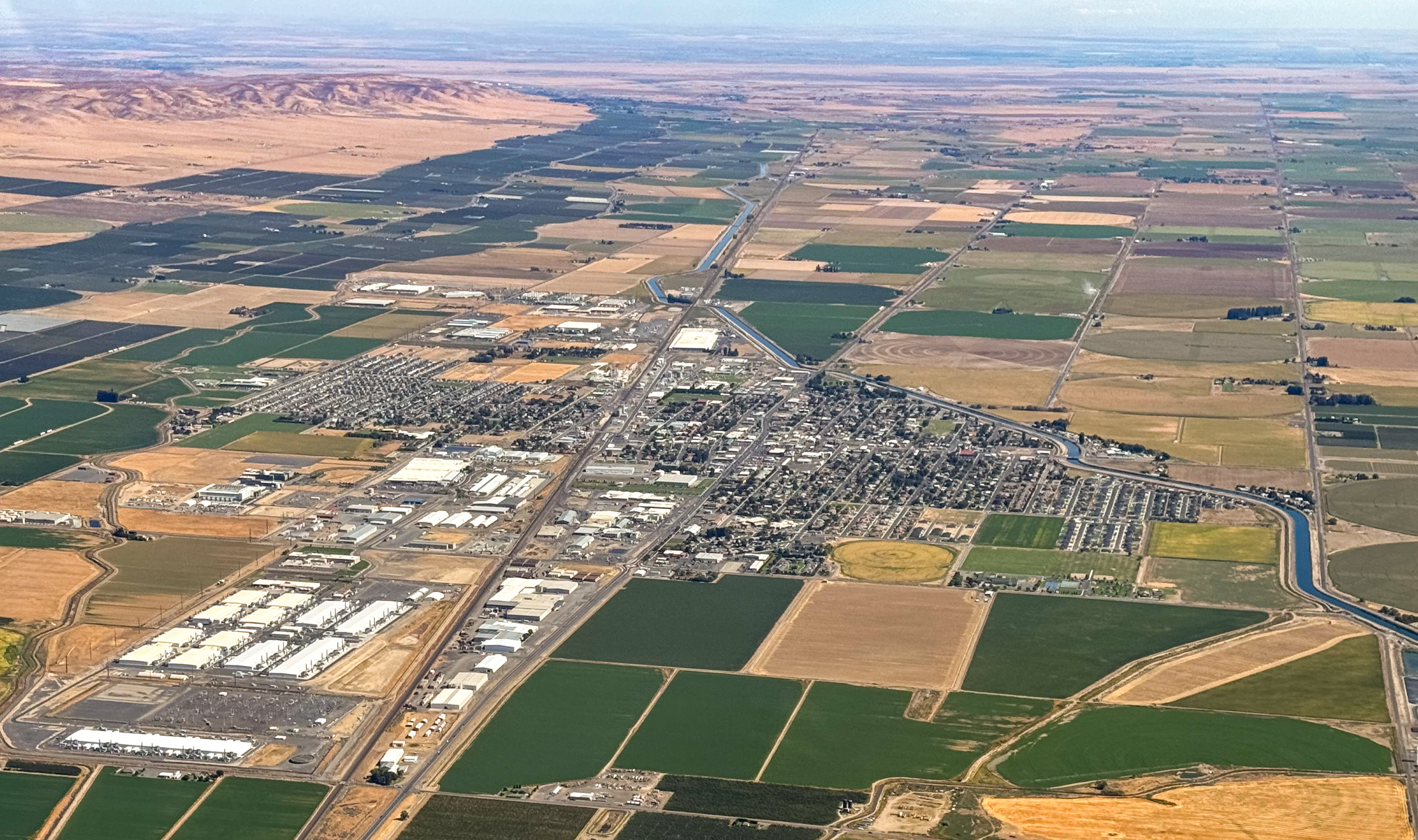
- Mottoes: Where Agriculture Meets Technology; Opportunities Unlimited
- Location of Quincy, Washington
- Coordinates: 47°14′31″N 119°51′08″W
- Country: United States
- State: Washington
- County: Grant

Government
  - Type: Mayor–council
  - Mayor: Paul Worley

Area
  - Total: 6.13 sq mi (15.88 km^{2})
  - Land: 6.05 sq mi (15.67 km^{2})
  - Water: 0.081 sq mi (0.21 km^{2})
- Elevation: 1,303 ft (397 m)

Population (2020)
  - Total: 7,543
  - Estimate (2021): 8,053
  - Density: 1,328/sq mi (512.6/km^{2})
- Time zone: UTC-8 (PST)
  - Summer (DST): UTC-7 (PDT)
- ZIP code: 98848
- Area code: 509
- FIPS code: 53-57115
- GNIS feature ID: 2411507
- Website: quincywashington.us

Quincy is a city in Grant County, Washington, United States. It is situated east of the Columbia River on State Route 28 and north of Interstate 90. The population was 7,543 at the 2020 census. Quincy is one of the closest cities to The Gorge Amphitheatre.

== History ==
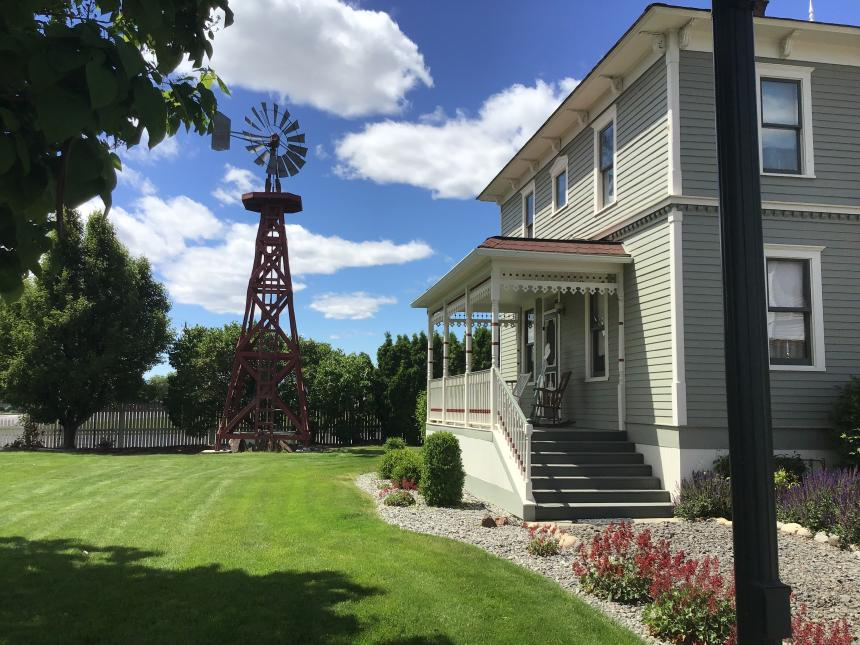
Historic Reiman-Simmons House at the Quincy Valley Museum

=== Geologic history ===
Quincy lies atop a part of the Columbia River Basalt Group, which is overlain by Pleistocene outburst flood deposits. The Missoula Floods had one of their outlets at Trinidad, close to Quincy, and another near Ancient Lakes, which includes the Ancient Lakes of the Columbia Valley AVA. Glacial erratics carried from as far away as Montana can be found nearby. The area also has an abundance of rimrock.

=== Great Northern Railway ===
Quincy was founded as a railroad camp during construction of the Great Northern Railway in 1892, and was incorporated on March 27, 1907. It was named after Quincy, Illinois.

=== Grand Coulee Dam ===
The arrival of the water from the Grand Coulee Dam in 1952 changed the town.

== Geography ==
According to the United States Census Bureau, the city has a total area of 5.04 square miles (13.05 km^{2}), of which, 4.96 square miles (12.85 km^{2}) is land and 0.08 square miles (0.21 km^{2}) is water.

=== Climate ===
Quincy has a cold desert climate (BSk) according to the Köppen climate classification system.

Climate data for Quincy, Washington, 1991–2020 normals, extremes 1941–present
Month	Jan	Feb	Mar	Apr	May	Jun	Jul	Aug	Sep	Oct	Nov	Dec	Year
Record high °F (°C)	63 (17)	73 (23)	79 (26)	92 (33)	99 (37)	106 (41)	109 (43)	107 (42)	100 (38)	89 (32)	75 (24)	70 (21)	109 (43)
Mean maximum °F (°C)	50.1 (10.1)	54.8 (12.7)	67.2 (19.6)	76.1 (24.5)	87.0 (30.6)	91.4 (33.0)	97.6 (36.4)	96.6 (35.9)	89.4 (31.9)	76.9 (24.9)	61.4 (16.3)	50.3 (10.2)	98.9 (37.2)
Mean daily maximum °F (°C)	35.8 (2.1)	43.2 (6.2)	55.0 (12.8)	63.6 (17.6)	72.1 (22.3)	78.7 (25.9)	86.7 (30.4)	85.8 (29.9)	77.3 (25.2)	62.7 (17.1)	46.0 (7.8)	33.8 (1.0)	61.7 (16.5)
Daily mean °F (°C)	29.4 (−1.4)	34.8 (1.6)	43.7 (6.5)	51.0 (10.6)	59.3 (15.2)	65.8 (18.8)	72.4 (22.4)	71.4 (21.9)	63.1 (17.3)	50.5 (10.3)	37.8 (3.2)	27.6 (−2.4)	50.6 (10.3)
Mean daily minimum °F (°C)	23.0 (−5.0)	26.4 (−3.1)	32.4 (0.2)	38.4 (3.6)	46.4 (8.0)	52.9 (11.6)	58.2 (14.6)	57.0 (13.9)	48.8 (9.3)	38.3 (3.5)	29.6 (−1.3)	21.4 (−5.9)	39.4 (4.1)
Mean minimum °F (°C)	8.4 (−13.1)	13.8 (−10.1)	21.1 (−6.1)	27.9 (−2.3)	34.5 (1.4)	43.6 (6.4)	48.4 (9.1)	47.3 (8.5)	38.2 (3.4)	25.1 (−3.8)	14.4 (−9.8)	8.5 (−13.1)	2.3 (−16.5)
Record low °F (°C)	−29 (−34)	−25 (−32)	0 (−18)	17 (−8)	23 (−5)	33 (1)	36 (2)	37 (3)	26 (−3)	9 (−13)	−15 (−26)	−19 (−28)	−29 (−34)
Average precipitation inches (mm)	1.00 (25)	0.65 (17)	0.64 (16)	0.53 (13)	0.72 (18)	0.48 (12)	0.23 (5.8)	0.21 (5.3)	0.37 (9.4)	0.53 (13)	1.13 (29)	1.37 (35)	7.86 (198.5)
Average precipitation days (≥ 0.01 in)	6.8	5.0	4.5	4.2	4.1	3.7	1.2	1.4	2.2	4.1	7.7	8.0	52.9
Source 1: NOAA
Source 2: National Weather Service

== Demographics ==
Historical population
Census	Pop.	Note	%±
1910	264		—
1920	285		8.0%
1930	266		−6.7%
1940	318		19.5%
1950	804		152.8%
1960	3,269		306.6%
1970	3,237		−1.0%
1980	3,525		8.9%
1990	3,738		6.0%
2000	5,044		34.9%
2010	6,750		33.8%
2020	7,543		11.7%
2021 (est.)	8,053		6.8%
U.S. Decennial Census; 2020 Census

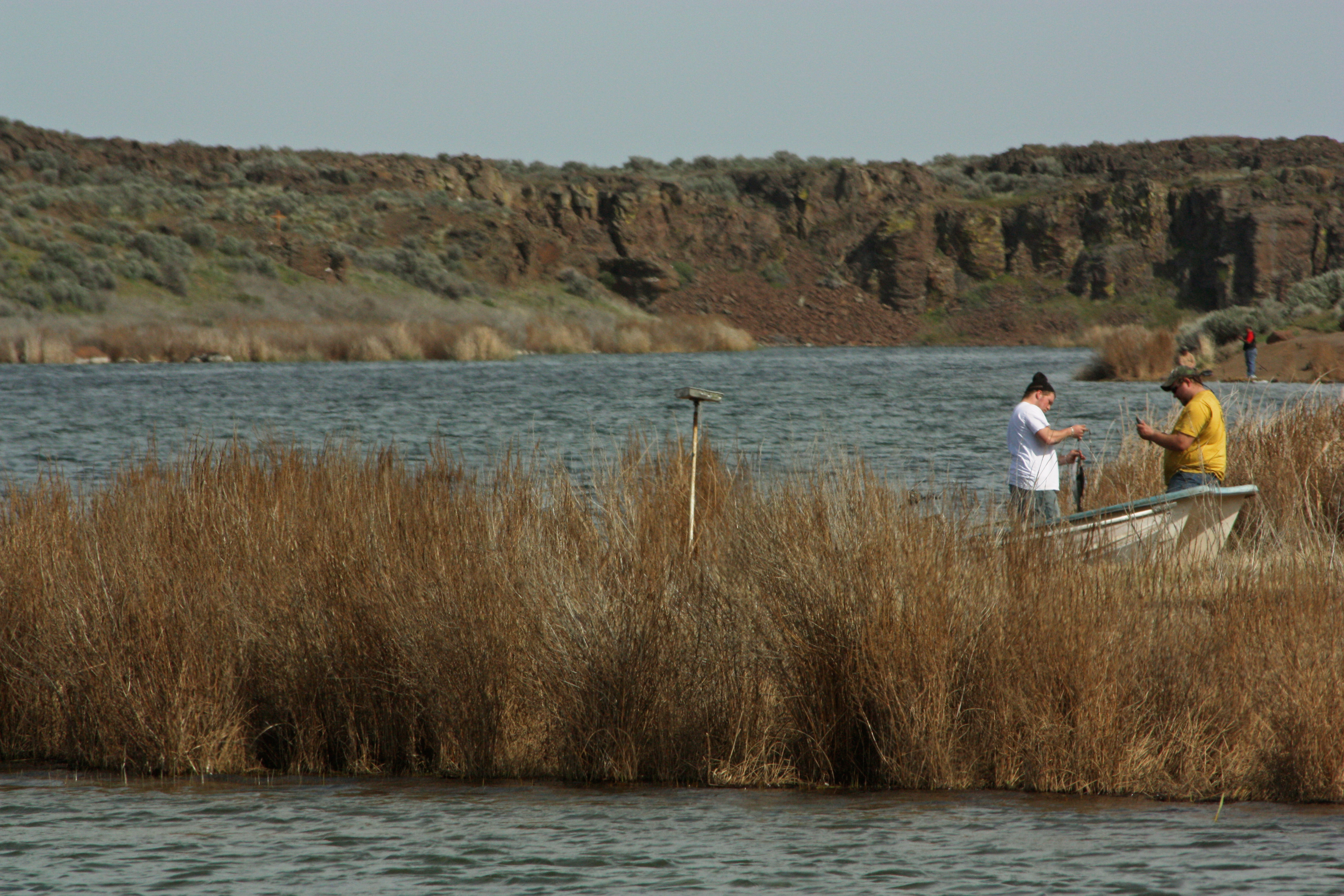
Fishing, hiking and bird-watching occur at nearby Quincy Lake, a remnant of the temporary Pleistocene lakes that were created by flood waters from glacial Lake Missoula.

=== 2020 census ===
As of the 2020 census, Quincy had a population of 7,543. The median age was 28.8 years. 33.8% of residents were under the age of 18 and 10.2% of residents were 65 years of age or older. For every 100 females there were 97.6 males, and for every 100 females age 18 and over there were 99.2 males age 18 and over.

99.7% of residents lived in urban areas, while 0.3% lived in rural areas.

There were 2,304 households in Quincy, of which 49.3% had children under the age of 18 living in them. Of all households, 50.7% were married-couple households, 16.4% were households with a male householder and no spouse or partner present, and 24.8% were households with a female householder and no spouse or partner present. About 16.3% of all households were made up of individuals and 7.0% had someone living alone who was 65 years of age or older.

There were 2,431 housing units, of which 5.2% were vacant. The homeowner vacancy rate was 1.2% and the rental vacancy rate was 5.7%.

Racial composition as of the 2020 census
Race	Number	Percent
White	2,396	31.8%
Black or African American	22	0.3%
American Indian and Alaska Native	109	1.4%
Asian	67	0.9%
Native Hawaiian and Other Pacific Islander	3	0.0%
Some other race	3,400	45.1%
Two or more races	1,546	20.5%
Hispanic or Latino (of any race)	5,845	77.5%

=== 2010 census ===
As of the 2010 census, there were 6,750 people, 1,915 households, and 1,541 families residing in the city. The population density was 1,360.9 inhabitants per square mile (525.4/km^{2}). There were 2,020 housing units at an average density of 407.3 per square mile (157.3/km^{2}). The racial makeup of the city was 54.9% White, 0.4% African American, 0.9% Native American, 0.7% Asian, 0.2% Pacific Islander, 40.6% from other races, and 2.4% from two or more races. Hispanic or Latino of any race were 74.3% of the population.

There were 1,915 households, of which 55.2% had children under the age of 18 living with them, 55.2% were married couples living together, 16.2% had a female householder with no husband present, 9.0% had a male householder with no wife present, and 19.5% were non-families. 15.1% of all households were made up of individuals, and 6.7% had someone living alone who was 65 years of age or older. The average household size was 3.51 and the average family size was 3.87.

The median age in the city was 26.2 years. 36.6% of residents were under the age of 18; 11.5% were between the ages of 18 and 24; 26.9% were from 25 to 44; 16.6% were from 45 to 64; and 8.3% were 65 years of age or older. The gender makeup of the city was 50.7% male and 49.3% female.

=== 2000 census ===
As of the 2000 census, there were 5,044 people, 1,470 households, and 1,176 families residing in the city. The population density was 2,252.8 people per square mile (869.4/km^{2}). There were 1,552 housing units at an average density of 693.2 per square mile (267.5/km^{2}). The racial makeup of the city was 75.1% White, 12.3% African American, 0.9% Native American, 3.6% Asian, 0.1% Pacific Islander, 5.5% from other races, and 2.4% from two or more races. Hispanic or Latino of any race were 12.5% of the population.

There were 1,470 households, out of which 50.1% had children under the age of 18 living with them, 62.0% were married couples living together, 11.8% had a female householder with no husband present, and 20.0% were non-families. 17.9% of all households were made up of individuals, and 8.5% had someone living alone who was 65 years of age or older. The average household size was 3.38 and the average family size was 3.79.

In the city, the population was spread out, with 36.0% under the age of 18, 10.6% from 18 to 24, 28.3% from 25 to 44, 16.1% from 45 to 64, and 9.0% who were 65 years of age or older. The median age was 27 years. For every 100 females, there were 106.3 males. For every 100 females age 18 and over, there were 104.7 males.

The median income for a household in the city was $32,181, and the median income for a family was $31,847. Males had a median income of $27,813 versus $18,750 for females. The per capita income for the city was $12,649. About 18.4% of families and 20.9% of the population were below the poverty line, including 24.5% of those under age 18 and 6.3% of those age 65 or over.

== Economy ==
=== Farming ===
Quincy has long had an agricultural economy, which was enhanced by irrigation made possible with the Grand Coulee Dam. Major crops include potatoes, wheat, and timothy grass. Orchards and vineyards are also displacing lower-value crops in the Quincy Valley.

An investigation into the dumping of toxic waste onto farmland and its relabeling as fertilizer in Quincy was the subject of the 2001 book Fateful Harvest.

=== Technology ===
Technology companies such as Microsoft, Yahoo!, Dell and Intuit have located large data centers within the Quincy area since 2007. Microsoft's Columbia Data Center, built starting in 2006 and expanded several times, is said to be the world's largest data center. The centers, attracted to the area because of its abundant and cheap hydroelectricity, have been criticized for dodging fines from the Grant County Public Utility District for overusing electricity and for creating air pollution through their diesel backup generators.

The data centers are incentivized by tax credits offered by the state of Washington to stimulate economic development in the city. Two additional electrical substations are being built to handle expected demand from current and future companies.

=== Tourism ===
Although George is the closest town to the Gorge Amphitheatre, Quincy is the closest town that offers services such as motels and a full grocery store. Quincy sees an uptick in population during concerts.

The semi-arid climate allows Quincy to go for weeks or months without rain during the summer. This makes nearby water recreation such as Crescent Bar a major draw. Quincy is the closest town with services to Crescent Bar. The Quincy area offers boating, water skiing, hunting, fishing, and snow skiing during parts of the year.

== Culture ==
Every 2nd Saturday in September, Quincy celebrates Farmer-Consumer Awareness Day. For a month beforehand, the roads leading to town are decorated with signs showing local crops and products made with them. On the day of the celebration, floats created by local schools and farm equipment parade through town. Free agricultural and geology tours are offered, as well as a produce sale, tractor pull, Farm-to-Market fun run, and many other activities.

== Education ==
The city is served by the Quincy School District.

== Parks and recreation ==
Quincy has several parks including an aqua park with a waterslide with 2 water fed half tubes, heated pools, and special areas for kids. The park is also home to a large field with a baseball diamond, playground, picnic area, and small skate-park.

== Notable people ==
- Colleen Atwood, costume designer
- Alex Ybarra, State Representative
