= Smohalla =

Wanapum religious leader (died 1895)

Smohalla (Dreamer) (c. 1815 – 1895) was a Wanapum dreamer-prophet associated with the Washani, a Native American religious movement among Native American people in the Pacific Northwest's Columbia Plateau region.

== Biography ==
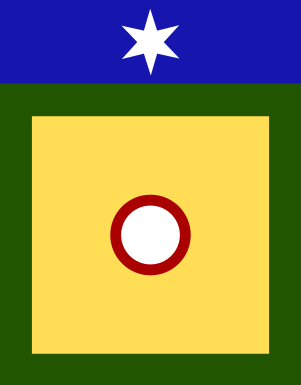
Smohalla's banner raised at P'na Village in 1884

Born between 1815 and 1820 in the Wallula area of present-day Washington state, Smohalla belonged to the Shahaptian Wanapum (also Wanapam; called Sokulk by Lewis and Clark) tribal group. At birth he was called Wak-wei or Kuk-kia, meaning "arising from the dust of earth mother". After achieving prominence as a spiritual leader, he became known as Smohalla (or Smo-halla, Shmoqula, Smuxale, Smowalla, IPA: [ˈʃmuχala]), also defined as "preacher". Still other names associated with him include Yuyunipitqana, "the shouting mountain" and Waipshwa, "Rock carrier".

Following political conflicts with the Walla Walla chief Homily (Homli), Smohalla and his followers moved to the more isolated area of P'na Village at the foot of Priest Rapids in present-day Yakima County, Washington. Already distinguished as a warrior, Smohalla began to preach his revitalization doctrine, which emphasized a return to tribal traditions and beliefs around about 1850. The rapid spread of his teachings is said to have contributed to the confederation of tribes in the region against white expansionism in the Yakima War of 1855–1856. Precipitated by government plans to confine Native people to small reservations, the war was fought by a coalition of Indians opposed to the assault on their land base and traditional cultures. Shortly after the war, Smohalla is said to have fought with Moses, a Sinkiuse-Columbia chief, and was nearly killed. Presumed dead, he revived enough to escape by boat.

It is said that he then set forth on a journey. According to this account, he traveled as far south as Mexico, returning by way of Arizona, Utah and Nevada where he is said to observed Mormon priests "receiving commands directly from heaven". When he reached home, he reported to the people that he had been to the spirit world. However, this version was discounted by Wanapum elders and descendants of Smohalla, who argued instead that his communication with the spirits is said to have occurred while he was mourning the loss of a beloved child.

Already known as a medicine man, the teachings he acquired at this time established him as a prophet. Smohalla exhorted his followers, eventually numbering about 2,000, to return to the ways of their ancestors and to relinquish the teachings and goods of the intruders. One of the best known of a series of prophets in the area, he revived the Washani Religion and the Washat Dance (religion) traditions while introducing other features from his dream or vision. Washani followers believed in the superiority of God and Mother Earth. Adherents included the famous Chief Joseph and his Nez Percé followers as well as Native people from other tribes in the region, such as the Wanapum. One of Smohalla's chief supporters and assistant was Kotiakan, a Yakama prophet, who helped him in the revitalization movement.

Despite government opposition and interference, Smohalla practiced his religion until the end of his life. After his death in 1895, he was succeeded by his son Yoyouni (also Yo-Yonan), then by his nephew Puck Hyah Toot. They carried the Washani movement into the twentieth century.

== See also ==
- John Slocum
- Wovoka
- Revitalization movement
