= Vantage Bridge =

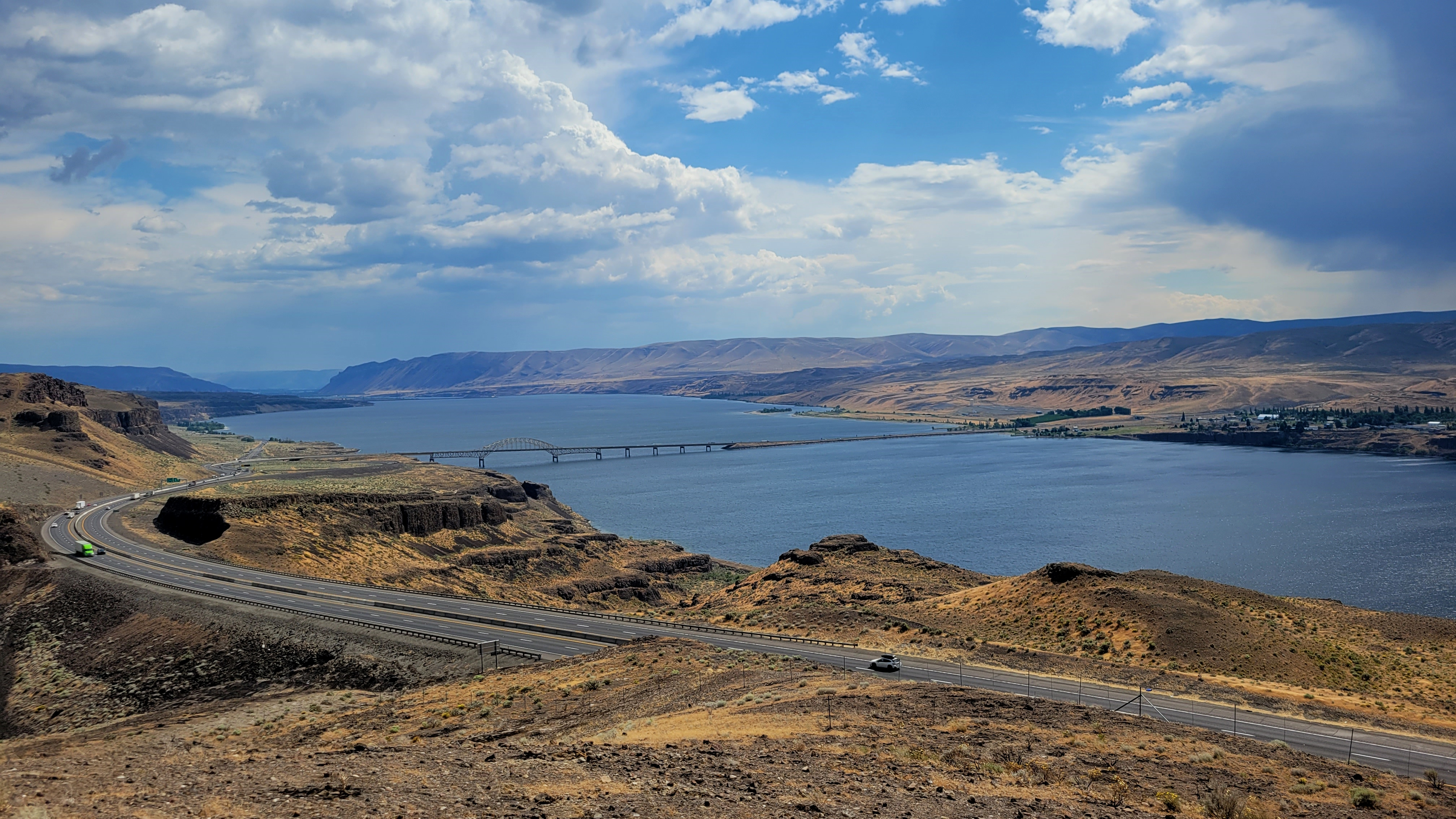
- Coordinates: 46°56′37″N 119°58′02″W
- Carries: I-90
- Crosses: Columbia River
- Locale: Vantage, Washington
- Maintained by: Washington State DOT
- ID number: 0006533A0000000

Characteristics
- Design: Through arch bridge
- Total length: 2,504 ft (763.2 m)
- Height: 22.9 m (75 ft)
- Longest span: 160 m (520 ft)

History
- Construction end: 1962
- Dedicated: November 9, 1962

Statistics
- Daily traffic: 11,916 (2002)

Location
- Interactive map of Vantage Bridge

The Vantage Bridge is a bridge in the U.S. state of Washington. It carries Interstate 90 across the Columbia River, near Vantage and George, Washington. This section of the river is named Wanapum Lake; it is the reservoir formed by Wanapum Dam. The bridge separates the Ginkgo Petrified Forest and Wanapum Recreational Area State Park on the western bank of the Columbia.

The current bridge is the second Vantage Bridge. The first was built in 1927 as part of the Sunset Highway (later US 10), a precursor to I-90. In 1962 the second bridge was built because the reservoir pool backing up behind the new Wanapum Dam would soon overwhelm the old bridge; it was dedicated by the state on November 9, 1962. The first bridge was dismantled for reuse. The steel cantilever truss was reused for the Lyons Ferry Bridge, which opened in 1968 to carry SR 261 across the Snake River.

The bridge deck is scheduled to be replaced between 2024 and 2027 with seasonal lane closures. It is the first major overhaul since 1982.
