= Ginkgo Petrified Forest State Park =

State park in Washington state, United States

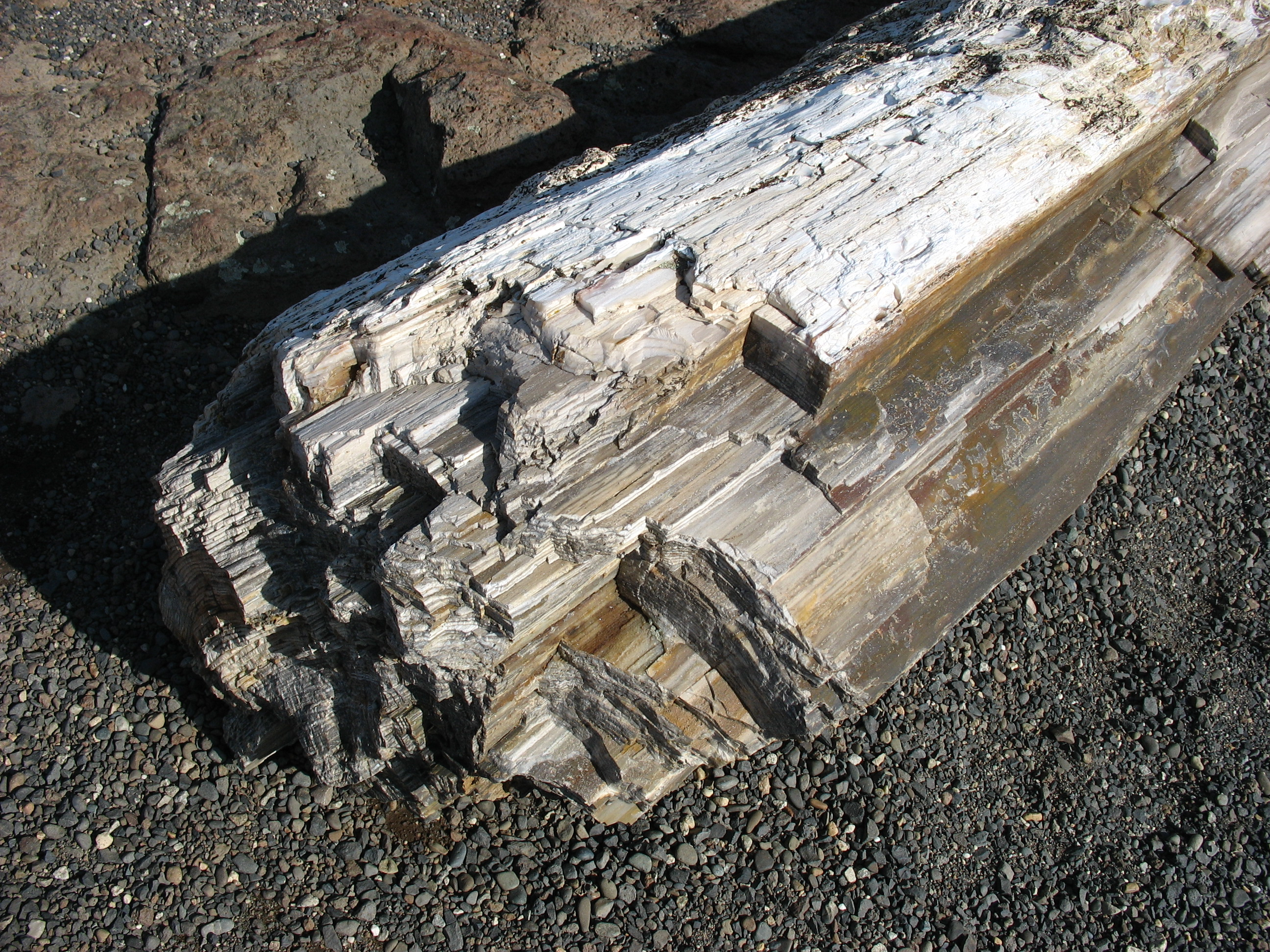
- Petrified logs at the park interpretive center

- Location within Washington (state) Location within the United States
- Location: Kittitas County, Washington, United States
- Coordinates: 46°54′08″N 119°59′23″W
- Area: 7,124 acres (2,883 ha)
- Elevation: 791 ft (241 m)
- Established: 1931
- Administrator: Washington State Parks and Recreation Commission
- Visitors: 163,391 (in 2024)
- Website: Official website

U.S. National Natural Landmark
- Designated: 1965

Ginkgo Petrified Forest State Park is a geologic preserve and public recreation area covering 7,124-acre (2,883 ha) on the western shoreline of the Columbia River's Wanapum Reservoir at Vantage, Washington. Petrified wood was discovered in the region in the early 1930s, which led to creation of the state park as a national historic preserve. Over 50 species are found petrified at the site, including ginkgo, sweetgum, redwood, Douglas-fir, walnut, spruce, elm, maple, horse chestnut, cottonwood, magnolia, madrone, sassafras, yew, and witch hazel.

== History ==
=== Origin ===
The stratum in which the park lies belongs to the Miocene epoch of the Neogene period, around 15.5 million years ago. During the Miocene, the region was lush and wet, home to many plant species now extinct. A number of these trees were buried in volcanic ash, and the organic matter in the tree trunks was gradually replaced by minerals in the groundwater; the resulting petrified wood was protected for millennia by flows of basalt. Near the end of the last ice age, the catastrophic Missoula Floods (about 15,000 BCE) eroded the basalt, exposing some of the petrified wood.

Stone House	Park entrance features a petrified log

=== Original inhabitants ===
In prehistoric times, the Wanapum tribe of Native Americans inhabited the region along the Columbia River from the Beverly Gap to the Snake River. The Wanapum people first welcomed white strangers in the area during Lewis and Clark's expeditions across the United States.

They lived by fishing and agriculture, carved over 300 petroglyphs into the basalt cliffs, and may have used the petrified wood exposed by erosion for arrowheads and other tools. According to documentation at the park, Wanapum never fought white settlers, did not sign a treaty with them, and, as a result, retained no federally recognized right to the land.

=== First museum ===
Around 1927, highway workers noticed the petrified wood, leading geologist George F. Beck to organize excavations. The Civilian Conservation Corps completed the excavation, built a small museum, and opened the park to the public in 1938.

The petrified wood specimens in the museum were collected by Frank Walter Bobo, who was born 4 March 1894 in California. He moved to Cle Elum, Kittitas County, Washington. He became a "desert rat" digging petrified logs from the arid hills of Kittitas and Yakima counties.

Bobo was commissioned to collect, saw, and polish the specimens for the museum. He was partially compensated by being allowed to keep one-half of the specimens he prepared while on commission. His son, Don J. Bobo, Teanaway Valley, Washington, inherited his father's collection of about one ton of petrified wood.

=== Inundation ===
In 1963, Wanapum Dam was completed about four miles (6 km) downstream, raising the water level of the Columbia River. A new Interpretive Center was constructed and about 60 petroglyphs salvaged from the rising water. Many of the salvaged petroglyphs are on display at the Interpretive Center.

=== Recognition ===
In October 1965, the National Park Service designated the Ginkgo Petrified Forest as a National Natural Landmark. Petrified wood was named the Washington state gem by the state legislature in 1975.

== Activities and amenities ==
The park museum has displays of both petrified wood and Wanapum petroglyphs. The park's Trees of Stone Interpretive Trail follows an exposed section of prehistoric Lake Vantage past 22 species of petrified logs that were left where they were discovered in the 1930s. The trail includes a 1.5-mile loop through sagebrush-covered hills and a longer 2.5-mile loop. The park also has 27,000 feet (8,200 m) of Columbia River shoreline with swimming and boating access as well as camping facilities.
