= Flood Control Act of 1950 =

Title II of Public Law 516-81st Congress, which per Section 216 thereof may be cited as The Flood Control Act of 1950, was a law passed by the United States Congress authorizing flood control projects around the country.

The Act was prompted in part by floods that swept through the Columbia River watershed in 1948, destroying Vanport, then the second largest city in Oregon, and impacting cities as far north as Trail, British Columbia. By that time, local communities had become wary of federal hydroelectric projects, and sought local control of new developments. One consequence was that a public utility district in Grant County, Washington ultimately began construction of the dam at Priest Rapids.
