= Starbuck, Washington =

Starbuck
- Town
- Starbuck, Washington
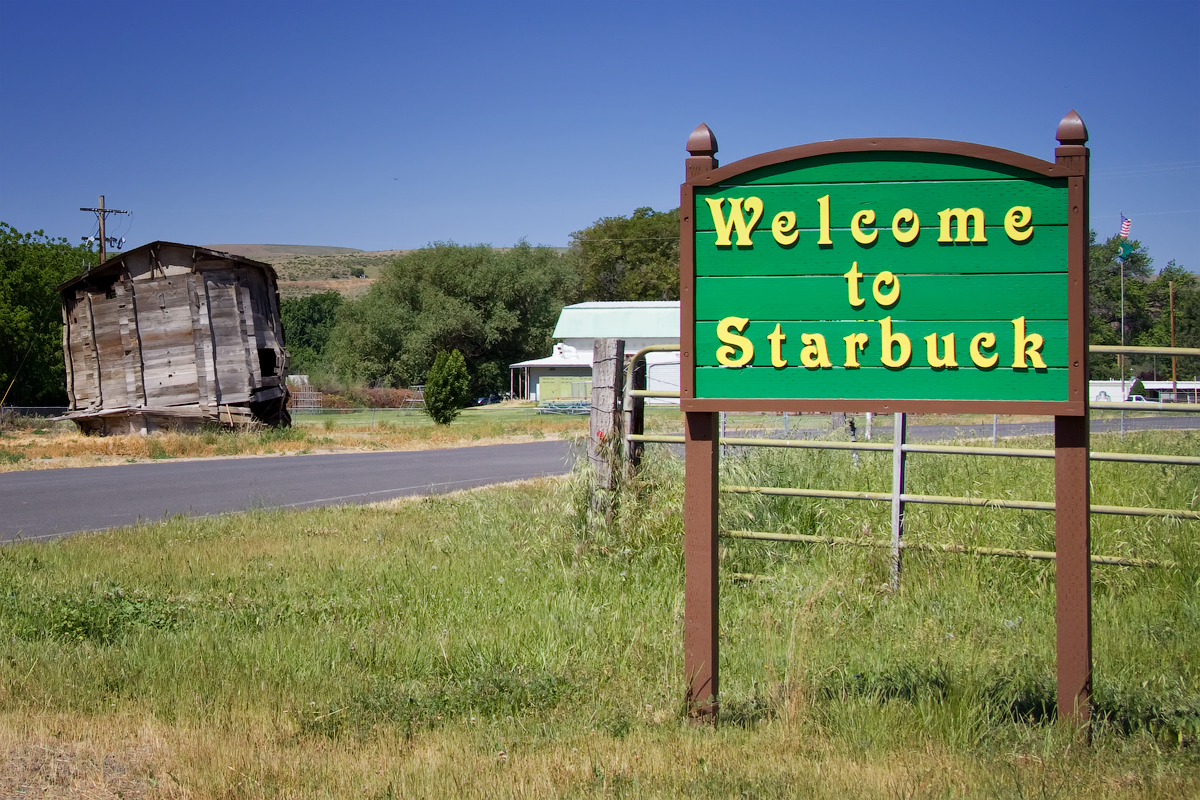
- Welcome sign in Starbuck

- Location of Starbuck, Washington
- Coordinates: 46°31′06″N 118°07′36″W
- Country: United States
- State: Washington
- County: Columbia

Government
  - Type: Mayor-Council
  - Mayor: Charles Hill

Area
  - Total: 0.20 sq mi (0.51 km^{2})
  - Land: 0.20 sq mi (0.51 km^{2})
  - Water: 0 sq mi (0.00 km^{2})
- Elevation: 650 ft (200 m)

Population (2020)
  - Total: 119
  - Density: 600/sq mi (230/km^{2})
- Time zone: UTC-8 (Pacific (PST))
  - Summer (DST): UTC-7 (PDT)
- ZIP code: 99359
- Area code: 509
- FIPS code: 53-67490
- GNIS feature ID: 2413330
- Website: Town of Starbuck

Starbuck is a town in Columbia County, Washington, United States. The population was 119 at the 2020 census.

== History ==
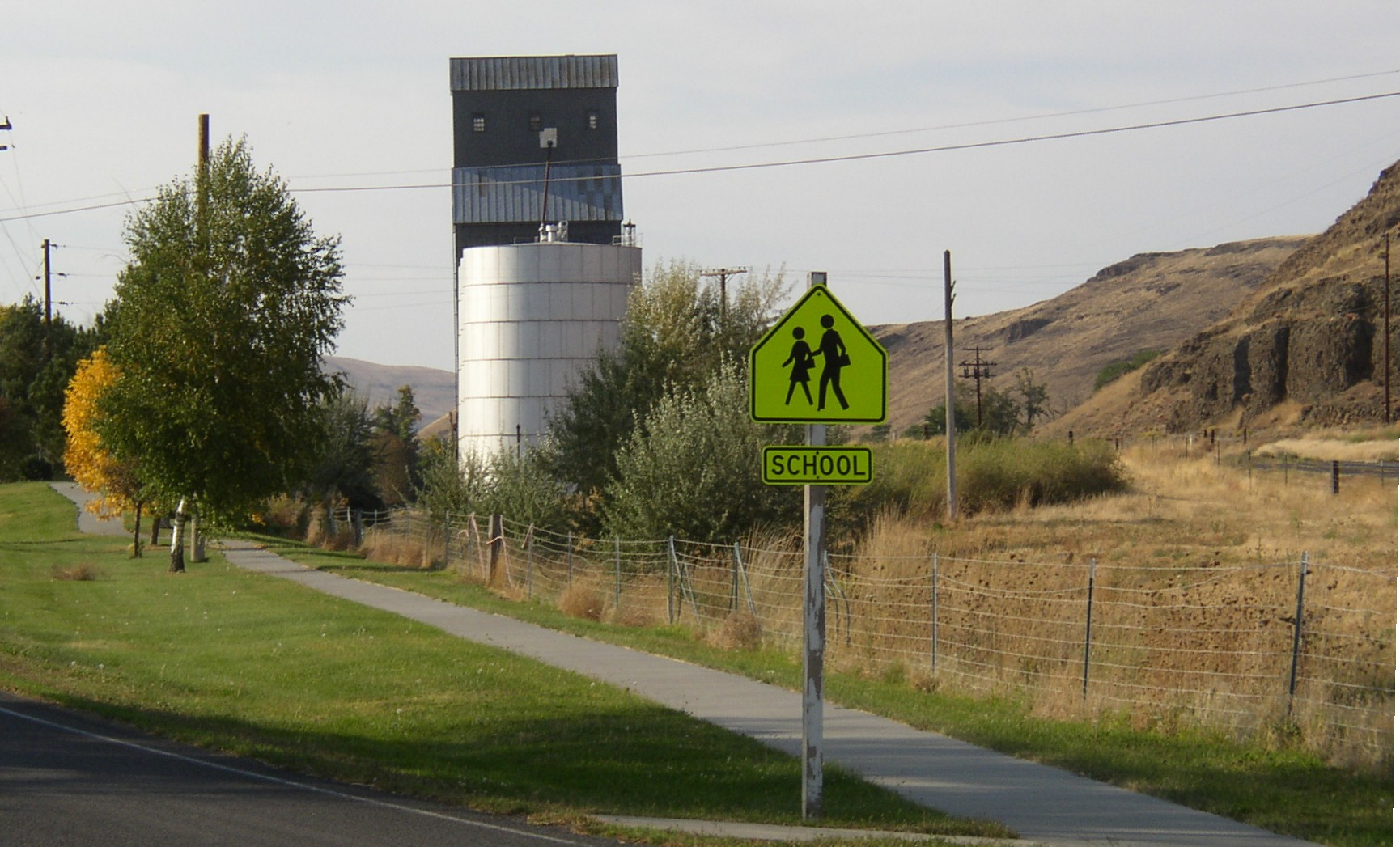
Grain elevator in Starbuck.

Named for railroad official W. H. Starbuck, the town was originally a junction on the main line of the Oregon Railroad and Navigation Company. The town was platted in 1894, and built its first bank ten years later. In 1886, the railroad completed a line eastward from Starbuck to Pomeroy and Pataha City in Garfield County; the line remained in operation until 1981. The town was officially incorporated on September 18, 1905. In 1910, a large brick school was built.

In 1914 a bridge over the Snake River was completed downstream from Lyon's Ferry, which greatly diminished the railroad traffic through the town. The economy of the town turned to agriculture, but in 1929 the bank failed. The town's population dwindled steadily until the mid-twentieth century. The high school shut down in 1956, and students were bussed to Dayton. In 1961, the railroad station was shut down as well.

In 1968, the Snake River Bridge, which was originally built over the Columbia at Vantage in 1927 and disassembled in 1963, was re-assembled in the area, providing additional access over the Snake River. In 1970, the Little Goose Dam was completed about nine miles northeast of Starbuck.

== Geography ==
According to the United States Census Bureau, Starbuck has a total area of 0.21 square miles (0.54 km^{2}), all of it land.

=== Climate ===
According to the Köppen Climate Classification system, Starbuck has a semi-arid climate, abbreviated "BSk" on climate maps.

== Demographics ==
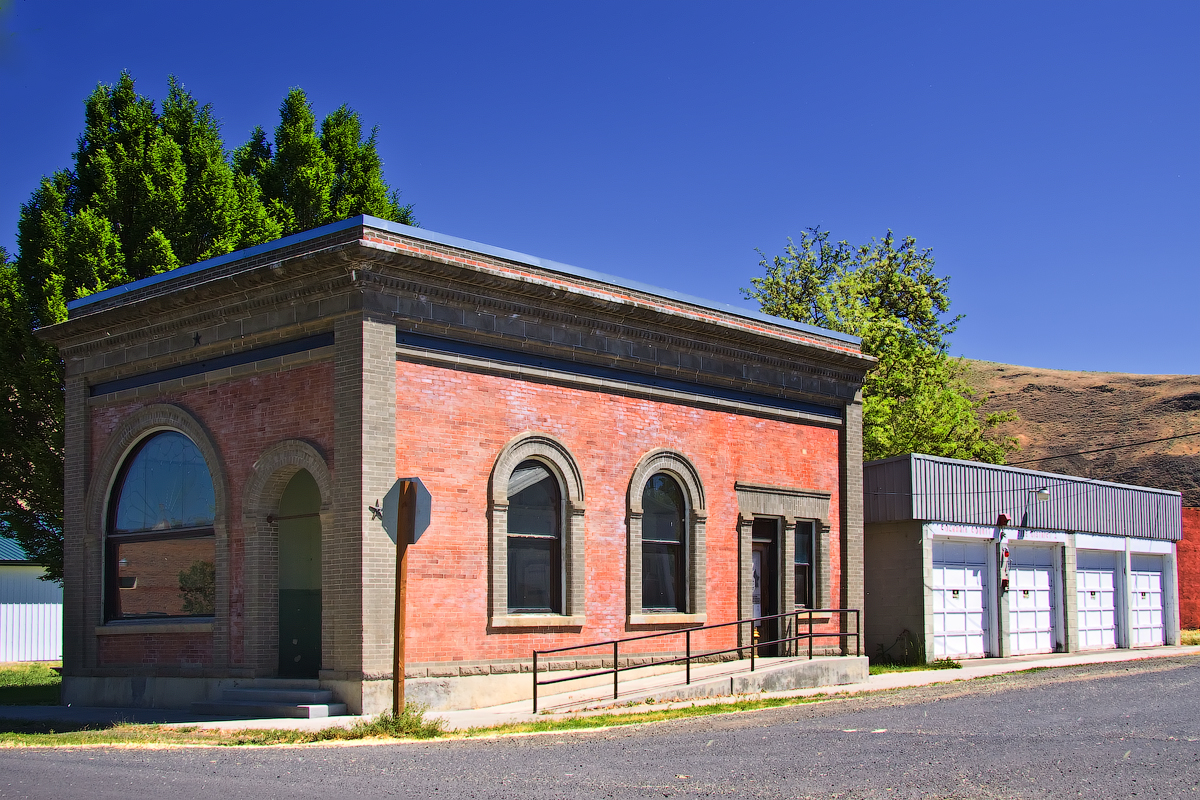
Starbuck City Hall

Historical population
Census	Pop.	Note	%±
1910	761		—
1920	524		−31.1%
1930	346		−34.0%
1940	251		−27.5%
1950	194		−22.7%
1960	161		−17.0%
1970	216		34.2%
1980	198		−8.3%
1990	170		−14.1%
2000	130		−23.5%
2010	129		−0.8%
2020	119		−7.8%
U.S. Decennial Census; 2020 Census

=== 2010 census ===
As of the 2010 census, there were 129 people, 73 households, and 38 families residing in the town. The population density was 614.3 inhabitants per square mile (237.2/km^{2}). There were 91 housing units at an average density of 433.3 per square mile (167.3/km^{2}). The racial makeup of the town was 90.7% non-Hispanic White, 0.8% Native American, 4.7% non-Hispanics reporting some other race, and 1.6% from two or more races. Hispanic or Latino of any race were 2.3% of the population.

There were 73 households, of which 13.7% had children under the age of 18 living with them, 42.5% were married couples living together, 5.5% had a female householder with no husband present, 4.1% had a male householder with no wife present, and 47.9% were non-families. 42.5% of all households were made up of individuals, and 20.5% had someone living alone who was 65 years of age or older. The average household size was 1.77 and the average family size was 2.32.

The median age in the town was 58.1 years. 10.9% of residents were under the age of 18; 0.7% were between the ages of 18 and 24; 16.4% were from 25 to 44; 38% were from 45 to 64; and 34.1% were 65 years of age or older. The gender makeup of the town was 50.4% male and 49.6% female.

=== 2000 census ===
As of the 2000 census, there were 130 people, 65 households, and 39 families residing in the town. The population density was 639.6 people per square mile (251.0/km^{2}). There were 86 housing units at an average density of 423.1 per square mile (166.0/km^{2}). The racial makeup of the town was 98.46% White, 0.77% Native American, and 0.77% from two or more races. Hispanic or Latino of any race were 2.31% of the population.

There were 65 households, out of which 13.8% had children under the age of 18 living with them, 47.7% were married couples living together, 10.8% had a female householder with no husband present, and 38.5% were non-families. 35.4% of all households were made up of individuals, and 13.8% had someone living alone who was 65 years of age or older. The average household size was 2.00 and the average family size was 2.45.

In the town, the population was spread out, with 14.6% under the age of 18, 6.2% from 18 to 24, 23.8% from 25 to 44, 26.9% from 45 to 64, and 28.5% who were 65 years of age or older. The median age was 50 years. For every 100 females, there were 106.3 males. For every 100 females age 18 and over, there were 109.4 males.

The median income for a household in the town was $18,125, and the median income for a family was $21,875. Males had a median income of $34,063 versus $13,750 for females. The per capita income for the town was $14,770. There were 15.2% of families and 24.3% of the population living below the poverty line, including 100.0% of under eighteens and 23.7% of those over 64.
