= Snake River Bridge =

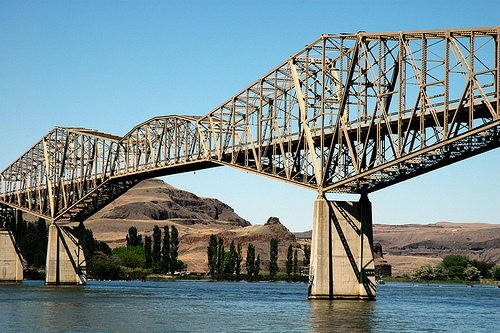
- Coordinates: 46°35′22.88″N 118°13′9.89″W
- Carries: SR 261
- Crosses: Snake River
- Locale: Near Starbuck, Washington
- Maintained by: WSDOT

Characteristics
- Design: Cantilever bridge
- Total length: 2,040 feet (620 m)
- Longest span: 518 feet (158 m)

History
- Construction start: 1926
- Construction end: 1927
- Opened: 1968 (at current location)
- Snake River Bridge
- U.S. National Register of Historic Places
- MPS: Historic Bridges/Tunnels in Washington State TR
- NRHP reference No.: 82004207
- Added to NRHP: July 16, 1982

Location
- Interactive map of Snake River Bridge

The Snake River Bridge (also known as the Lyons Ferry Bridge), is located on State Route 261 at the confluence of the Snake and Palouse Rivers, near Starbuck, Washington, USA. The bridge is listed on the National Register of Historic Places in 1982 and is located next to Lyons Ferry Park.

== Original construction ==
It was originally constructed in 1927 and known as the Vantage Ferry Bridge, where it carried the North Central Highway over the Columbia River in Vantage, replacing a four-car ferry. By 1923, the ferry was transporting 50,000 people across the river annually, and it was clear that a bridge was needed to replace it. Originally planned to be a privately constructed toll bridge, it was strongly opposed by Washington Governor Louis F. Hart because it would be a toll bridge on a taxpayer-supported highway. Not only that, but the state also stood to lose $900,000 in federal funds for the North Central Highway if a toll bridge were to be built. Instead, the state approved funding for its own bridge.

However, the construction of the Wanapum Dam downriver of the bridge in the 1960s flooded the town of Vantage, and state officials decided to replace the existing two-lane bridge, which had become unsafe for high volume traffic, with a new four-lane bridge. The old bridge was dismantled and put into storage.

Meanwhile, at Lyons Ferry, crossings of the Snake River were done by ferry, but the construction of the Lower Monumental Dam caused the river to slow, thus increasing crossing time. State officials then decided to reconstruct this bridge at that location.

== See also ==
- List of bridges documented by the Historic American Engineering Record in Washington (state)
- List of bridges on the National Register of Historic Places in Washington (state)
- Vantage Bridge
