= Priest Rapids Dam =

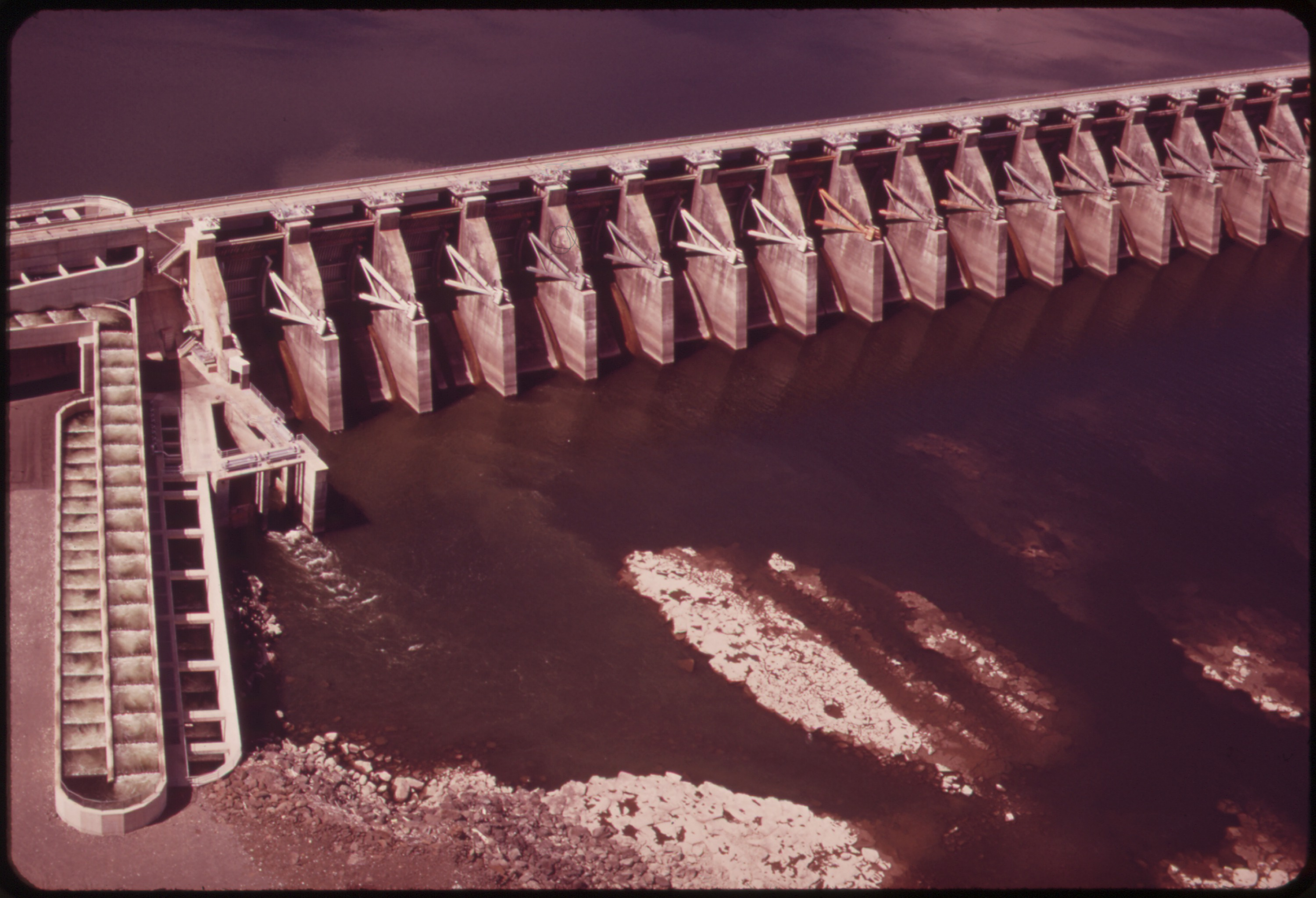
- The dam's spillway in June 1973
- Interactive map of Priest Rapids Dam
- Location: Grant / Yakima counties, Washington
- Coordinates: 46.6431876°N 119.9094884°W
- Construction began: July 1956
- Opening date: 1959 (first generation); 1961 (full completion)

Dam and spillways
- Impounds: Columbia River
- Height: 178 ft (54 m)
- Length: 10,103 ft (3,079 m)

Reservoir
- Creates: Priest Rapids Lake
- Total capacity: 237,100 acre⋅ft (0.2925 km^{3})

Power Station
- Turbines: 10
- Installed capacity: 955.6 MW

Priest Rapids Dam is a hydroelectric, concrete gravity dam located on the Columbia River between Yakima County and Grant County in the U.S. state of Washington. The Yakima Firing Range and the Hanford Nuclear Reservation are in the immediate vicinity of the dam. The dam is 24 miles (39 km) south of the town of Vantage, and 47 miles (76 km) northwest of the city of Richland. It is located at mile marker 397.1 from the mouth of the Columbia. It is owned by the Grant County Public Utility District (PUD). Priest Rapids, for which the dam was named, are now submerged beneath the dam's reservoir.

Priest Rapids Dam is part of the Columbia River Basin system of dams.

== History ==
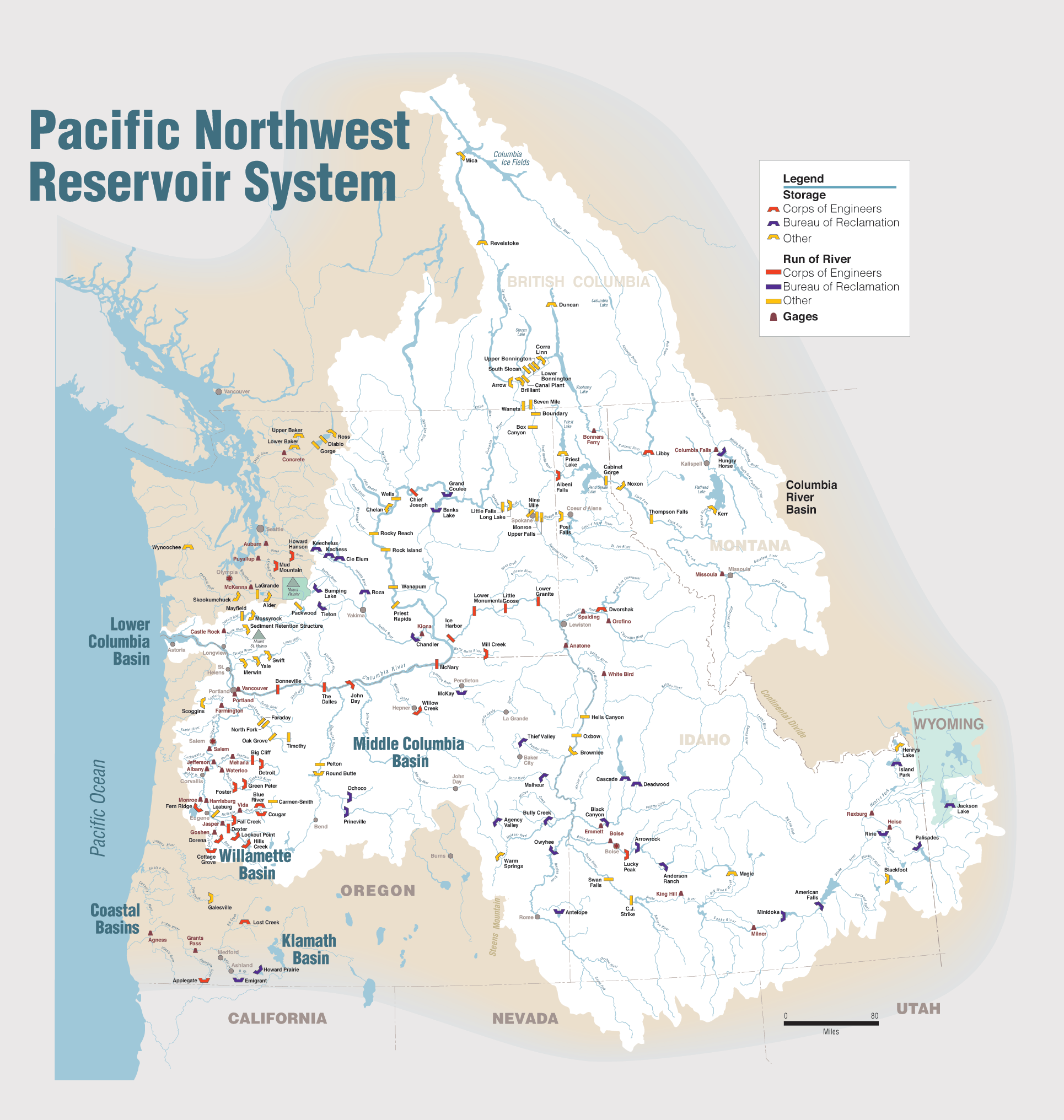
Columbia River Basin

After the disaster of 1949 Vanport Flood on the lower Columbia River, around Vancouver, Washington, and Portland, Oregon, the federal government established the Priest Rapids Project under the Flood Control Act of 1950 (Public Law 81-516; May 17, 1950). The U.S. Army Corps of Engineers (USACE) decided the project would not be a top priority, so the Grant PUD began looking at taking over the project from the USACE in 1952. With the passage of Public Law 83-544 in 1955, Congress gave Grant PUD the right to proceed. Revenue bonds were issued for construction to begin in July 1956, first generation occurred in 1959, and the dam was completed in 1961. Its reservoir is named Priest Rapids Lake, and extends 18 miles (29 km) upstream to spillway of Wanapum Dam. Downriver from Priest Rapids Dam is Hanford Reach, the only free-flowing, non-tidal stretch of the Columbia River in the United States.

The initial license expired in 2005, after which the Grant County PUD operated the dam on yearly license extensions while negotiations for license extension proceeded. The Federal Energy Regulatory Commission approved a license extension of 44 years for both this dam and the upstream Wanapum Dam on April 17, 2008. The license extension was conditioned upon programs to:

- modernize the power generation capability of the dam
- monitor water quality
- improve wildlife habitat
- protect nearly 700 Wanapum Tribe archaeological sites in the vicinity
- enhance recreation with new campsites, picnic areas and trails

=== Problems ===
An explosion injured six employees on October 8, 2015. Grant County PUD was fined $35,000 for safety violations.

Leaks have been discovered in the spillway monoliths. A "non-failure emergency" was declared, and the water level behind the dam was reduced by about three feet (0.91 m).

== See also ==
- List of dams in the Columbia River watershed
