= Fateful Harvest =

2001 nonfiction book by Duff Wilson

Fateful Harvest: The True Story of a Small Town, a Global Industry, and a Toxic Secret
- Author: Duff Wilson
- Publisher: HarperCollins
- Publication date: 2001
- ISBN: 978-0060931834

Fateful Harvest: The True Story of a Small Town, a Global Industry, and a Toxic Secret is a nonfiction book written by Duff Wilson, who was a reporter for the Seattle Times. The book began as a series of newspaper reports, which made the issue a "national focus".

Fateful Harvest focuses on Quincy, Washington. It was awarded Book of the Year from the press group Investigative Reports and Editors. It details Wilson's investigation into the recycling of fly ash, tire ash, flue dust, tailings, phosphoric acid from car factories, baghouse dust from recycling plants, zinc skimmings from galvanizing industries, and assorted other industrial byproducts with heavy metals and other chemicals into plant fertilizer based on the agronomic benefits of their alkalinity (sold as lime) or their micronutrients—zinc and manganese. It was reasoned that plants growing in alkaline soils do not uptake the metals as easily. The problem was brought to Wilson's attention in 1996 by Patty Martin, the mayor of Quincy, Washington, and Wilson and a small group of farmers conducted the investigation. The issue of heavy metals in fertilizer is sometimes mistakenly confused with biosolids, though there may be some crossover.

== Synopsis ==
=== Cenex and the rinsate pond ===
Farmer Dennis DeYoung, who lived outside of Quincy, bought fertilizer in 1985 from Land O'Lakes, and subsequently experienced one-tenth of the usual yield. DeYoung kept his bills and noted that he paid prices varying from 2.5 to 9 cents a pound for nitrogen fertilizer; in 1985, the average price for nitrogen fertilizer was 11 cents. In 1986, Washington began to pass stricter laws against dumping toxic waste. Cenex, the local agricultural company, dumped its excess chemicals into a concrete rinsate pond rather than on vacant land, and it filled quickly. Len Smith, who worked there for a summer dumping cans into the pool, recounted seeing its levels drop mysteriously overnight. By 1990, Cenex wanted to get rid of the rinsate pond, so it developed spreading technology that allowed it to use its chemicals on farms. Given the choice between spending $170,000 to put it in the Arlington, Oregon, hazardous waste facility, or "selling" the mixture as fertilizer, the company's managers chose the latter. Company officials later claimed under oath that state officials (whose names remain unknown) had told them to dump the waste as fertilizer. The company avoided testing the pond for anything but fertilizers and pesticides.

Cenex paid DeYoung to apply the "fertilizer" to his land then attempted to dilute it with massive amounts of water. The spreader, Dane Lindemeir, remembers objecting to the spreading of what he was told was a mix of fertilizer, atrazine, and trifluralin, because it did not look healthy, and it did not make sense to apply both atrazine, which kills beans, and trifluralin, which kills corn. Later that year, Cenex salesman Nerpel, a friend of DeYoung, told DeYoung that he should check the fertilizer. The corn hardly grew, and what was grown was sold as animal feed. DeYoung, worried about the liability of the toxic waste, tried to get Cenex to take over the land, which they reluctantly agreed to do. Cenex planted Sudan grass, which soaks up heavy metals, but the "extremely rank stand" of Sudan grass only covered 22 percent of the land. Although Cenex promised it would not sell the grass, its Quincy manager John Williams sold it to a neighbor for her horses, several of which died. Meanwhile, DeYoung hired lawyers, but did not make much headway against Cenex, which had the state government on its side. Another farmer, Tom Witte, purchased from Cenex and discovered his fields had substantially less yield, his cows developed cancer, and his field man was diagnosed with muscular dystrophy. In 1991 Witte filed for bankruptcy.

The conflict drew the attention of several community members, led by Patty Martin. When Martin called the Environmental Protection Agency (EPA), she was confused with Senator Patty Murray and the EPA visited the city for a thorough investigation. It found that the rinsate pond used to dump excess fertilizer and pesticides had beryllium levels of 1.39 ppm, cadmium at 25.2 ppm, and chromium at 360 ppm, as well as a variety of other metals and materials, all of which exceeded toxicity threshold levels. Titanium levels "hundreds of times higher than the highest level of titanium found in uncontaminated soil" were also found in several fertilizer tanks used by affected farmers. The farmers had their fertilizers and crops tested independently, which were found to contain lead and arsenic. Martin and other farmers' families had their children's hair tested, and found high levels of aforementioned metals. The homeopathist testing them claimed the families had the highest levels he had seen. Most of the affected farmers went bankrupt and lost in court; one lost because a memo to the regional manager claiming Cenex could save $170,000 in hazardous waste costs by selling the waste as fertilizer was discovered too late to use as evidence. In 1995, Cenex received a $10,000 fine for using a pesticide for an unapproved purpose, which had a maximum penalty of $200,000.

=== Investigation ===
Alarmed by this issue, Martin ran for mayor of Quincy. She and her bankrupt farmer friends researched the mysterious origin of metals in the fertilizer. They discovered that the ubiquitous practice of mixing tailings and other industrial waste with fertilizer was accepted and even encouraged as a way to recycle waste with some zinc or iron, and increasing landfill costs exacerbated the trend. Martin discovered, for example, a proposed state rule for disposing of cement kiln dust by using it as agricultural lime. She also discovered that Alcoa sold waste product as a fertilizer or road deicer through L-Bar, a smaller company. The product was sued twice in Oregon, where farmers settled out of court. Martin also believed that cancer rates were higher in Quincy, but the state toxicologist dismissed her claims, though the state tracked deaths, not illnesses, by place of death when many of the victims' traveled out of the county and died in advanced hospitals. Later, five people in Quincy came down with idiopathic pulmonary fibrosis. Ganesh Raghu told author Duff Wilson that this phenomenon strongly suggests environmental factors, as the disease is extremely rare.

==== Heavy Metal Task Force ====
The group contacted Wilson in 1996, who began investigating. He found that most government agencies knew little about fertilizer, but he was referred to EPA scientist Alan Rubin. Rubin said that while the purely organic, heavily studied, and regulated biosolids were hazardous, there was "almost no federal regulation on fertilizer" and that "[he had] never seen a state or federal limit on heavy metals in fertilizer". The only group researching these health risks, the Heavy Metal Task Force, was industry-funded despite being established by the state of California. It was concerned about California's Proposition 65, which required that people must be informed if they were being subjected to toxins. However, the group created a loophole to get around laws on hazardous wastes: some products were not classified as waste, so the limits of heavy metals in wastes did not apply to fertilizers. One of the particular loopholes was electric arc furnace dust K061, which was "simply not considered hazardous waste if it was used to make fertilizer". Wilson and a couple other concerned individuals met in February 1997, which comprised 15 industry officials and 5 state officials. The meeting began with fly ash; one of the men claimed that 4 million tons of coal ash and 2.1 million tons of flue dust was recycled into agricultural fertilizer and sold under names such as Lime Plus. At the meeting, one of the members suggested that Wilson examine Bay Zinc Company in Washington state, a leading manufacturer of the recycled "fertilizer". Before meeting with Dick Camp Jr. of Bay Zinc, Wilson discovered Cozinco, whose founder Kipp Smallwood was concerned about the metals in zinc fertilizers. The company had a comparison table and offered a free test, while claiming that most zinc fertilizers were three percent lead. Wilson later cited Zinc Nacionale, a Mexican recycling company, as another source of good zinc through high-temperature purification.

==== Bay Zinc Company ====
When it goes into our silo, it's a hazardous waste. When it comes out of the silo, it's no longer regulated. The exact same material. Don't ask me why. That's the wisdom of the EPA.

— Dick Camp Jr., CEO of Bay Zinc Company

Wilson reported that the Bay Zinc Company, founded by Dick Camp Sr., was a pioneer in the recycling of industrial byproducts into fertilizer. Camp Jr. recounted that his father might have been the first to use flue dust from steel smokestacks. Camp had been instrumental in creating the loopholes that allowed heavy metals in fertilizers to go unregulated. Between 1990 and 1996, Bay Zinc took in roughly 1.5 million pounds of lead, 86,000 pounds of chromium, and 19,000 pounds of nickel. Bay Zinc was relatively small in comparison to Alabama-based Frit Industries, which connected one its major factories to Nucor Steel. Together eight companies processed 120 million pounds of industrial byproducts into fertilizer, roughly half of the total zinc fertilizer sold in the country. This trade was facilitated by state industrial material exchanges (IMEX) used by twenty-six states. Mountain—Monsanto decided in 1994 that it no longer wanted the liability of using its industrial byproducts as fertilizer.

==== Soil science ====
Wilson found two scientists studying these problems: John Mortvedt and United States Department of Agriculture scientist Rufus Chaney. Mortvedt studied the uptake of cadmium by plants and found that plants absorbed cadmium quickly in acidic soil. He believed the cadmium in foods was small enough to be safe and cautioned that the soil should be kept alkaline. Chaney disagreed with Mortvedt: Wilson wrote that Chaney, an expert in phytoremediation, believed that a high zinc-to-cadmium ratio (at least 100 to 1) was needed to avoid cadmium's toxic effects. Chaney also noted that "heavy metals persist in surface soils for centuries to millennia in absence of erosive loss". Chaney also brought up a case in Georgia, where over 1,000 acres (4 km^{2}) of peanuts were destroyed when the pH dropped. The fertilizers had been bought from SoGreen.

==== Publication ====
Wilson was forced to publish the story when he heard that the Seattle Post-Intelligencer was working on it. He said that the New York Times ignored it, and most of the other newspapers relegated it to the last pages, but the story resonated with many people, including experts like an immunologist, several EPA officials, Congress members, and assorted other people. It also drew the attention of industry largely opposed to labeling. Some fertilizer companies, such as IMC Global, became aware of the problem of using the waste products and stopped the practice. Governor Gary Locke of Washington initially seemed willing to tackle the problem, but the state ended up with an industry-written bill that required no labeling requirements (toxicity information would be put on websites) and looser standards than Canada. Washington state's new regulations led to 56 stop-sale orders, 45 denied license applications, and 10 companies with cleaned up materials; one of these stop-sale orders went against Siemens AG, which previously sold nuclear fuel processing waste as fertilizer. No other state passed a law as strong as Washington. Chaney remarked that keeping the regulations at the state level was the most effective way to block effective regulation. DeYoung, whose court judgment was overruled, got a retrial; the jury could only decide damages, but local jurors were sympathetic to Cenex and considered DeYoung an incompetent farmer, so they awarded him nothing. Other farmers faced similar defeats, and they were denied the right to a class-action lawsuit.

== Current status ==
Patty Martin co-founded Safe Food and Fertilizer to raise awareness of unsafe practices. As of 2004, there was a "trend toward regulation of non-nutritive trace elements in fertilizers". As of 2019, Monsanto product glyphosate had been banned in many nations and the company was facing massive financial and legal repercussions.

== See also ==
- Duff Wilson
- U.S. Environmental Protection Agency
