= Lyons Ferry State Park =

State park in Washington (state), United States

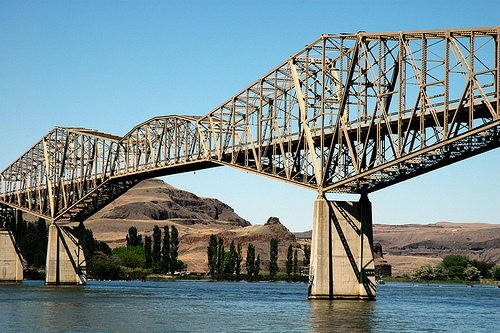
- Snake River Bridge, a major landmark of Lyons Ferry State Park

- Location within Washington (state) Location within the United States
- Location: Franklin County, Washington, United States
- Coordinates: 46°35′29″N 118°13′30″W
- Area: 168 acres (68 ha)
- Elevation: 541 ft (165 m)
- Established: 1971
- Administrator: Washington State Parks and Recreation Commission
- Website: Official website

Lyons Ferry State Park is a public recreation area located near the confluence of the Snake and Palouse rivers, seven miles (11 km) northwest of Starbuck, Washington. The state park is on Route 261, abreast of Lake Herbert G. West, a reservoir on the Snake River created with the construction in the 1960s of the Lower Monumental Dam some 17 miles (27 km) downstream. The park offers facilities for boating, fishing, and swimming. The area is managed cooperatively by the Washington State Parks and Recreation Commission and the U.S. Army Corps of Engineers, which operates the Lyons Ferry Marina.

== History ==
The park bears the name of the Snake River ferry service, which ceased operations in 1968 after more than 100 years of service when it was replaced with the Snake River Bridge.

The U.S. Army Corps of Engineers began park construction in 1969, then leased the site to the state in 1971. It operated as a state park from 1971 until 2002, when the lease was relinquished by the state due to budget constraints. The Army Corps of Engineers operated the property as Lyons Ferry Park and Lyons Ferry Marina until 2015, when it returned to Washington State Park status with the signing of a new lease.
