= 1948 Columbia River flood =

1948 flood in the United States and Canada

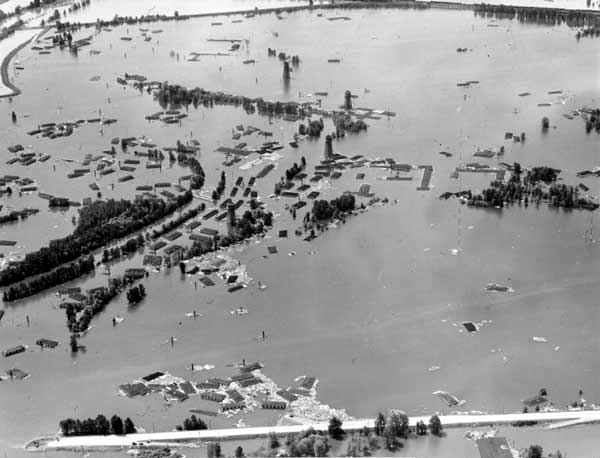
- Aerial view of Vanport, Oregon, during the flood
- Date: May–June 1948
- Location: Washington, Oregon, Idaho, and Montana in the United States and British Columbia, Canada
- Deaths: 16–102
- Property damage: $102.7 million ($1.2 billion in 2021)

The 1948 Columbia River flood (or Vanport Flood) was a regional flood that occurred in the Pacific Northwest of the United States and Canada. Large portions of the Columbia River watershed were impacted, including the Portland area, Eastern Washington, northeastern Oregon, Idaho Panhandle, northwestern Montana, and southeastern British Columbia. A publication of the U.S. Geological Survey in 1949 stated property damage reached $102.7 million (1949 value), 250,000 acres of farmland were flooded, 20,000 acres of land were damaged or destroyed, and at least 16 died in the flood (the phrasing suggests these were deaths from the Vanport community); estimates for total deaths from the flood go as high as 102. Among the damage was the complete destruction of Vanport, in the Portland metropolitan area, which was the second largest city in Oregon at the time. The flood was largely caused by rapid melting of above-average snowpack by heavy precipitation and warm temperatures. It remains the second largest flood recorded on the river.

== Meteorological synopsis ==
Above average snowfall was recorded in the mountains of the Columbia River watershed during the winter of 1947–48 resulting from more low pressure systems traversing the Pacific Northwest than normal. In early April, scientists at the University of Washington reported that snowpack was 20 to 40 percent deeper than average. Unusually cold temperatures were recorded in Eastern Washington during the spring months, helping deep snow to remain in place into May. During this time, the flood risk was noted by several government agencies, including the Department of Lands and Forests in British Columbia and the U.S. Weather Bureau.

From March 1 to May 1, the mean temperature at the Tri-Cities was recorded as 47.4 °F (8.6 °C), compared to a 30-year average of 50.7 °F (10.4 °C) at the time. Snow was recorded in places like Pullman into late April. This air was generally sourced from around 60°N in latitude, which is much further north than what is expected for the time of year, driven by persistent low pressure over the Canadian Rockies.

The weather pattern shifted in mid-May as low pressure set up off the coast of Northern California and a ridge of high pressure in the interior of North America. This brought warmer and more moist conditions with rain and thunderstorms.

=== Flood ===
Heavy rain caused the Columbia and its tributaries to rise, reaching 8 feet (2.4 m) above flood stage in the Portland area by May 25. At this point, levees generally contained the rivers, but another round of heavy rain and thunderstorms the following week brought another rise. One of these occurred on May 27, causing a flash flood on Dry Creek in Ephrata, Washington, where 60 blocks were damaged. Silt coming into the city blocked the storm drains, limiting how much water the city's infrastructure could carry.

On May 28, some larger tributaries of the Columbia had flooded. Temporary levees were built in Cle Elum and Ellensburg in an attempt to keep the Yakima River from flooding those communities. The Kootenai River flooded 25,000 acres (10,000 ha) of farmland in the Idaho Panhandle. Record setting flooding from the Columbia itself was observed in the Tri-Cities, Portland metropolitan area, and in Trail, British Columbia on May 30 and 31.

Many streamflow gauges on larger waterways like the Columbia recorded near-record high discharge rates, only being beat by major flooding in 1894 and 1876. Major flooding in 1849 likely also exceeded the 1948 peak but reliable records do not extend that far into the past for the area. The average spring discharge of the Columbia River in 1948 was 540,000 ft^{3}/sec (15,000 m^{3}/sec), but during the flooding values peaked around 1.01 million ft^{3}/sec (28,600 m^{3}/sec) and remained high for several weeks. Gauges on tributaries generally did not approach records, as smaller waterways see greater flooding from more localized events than is seen in most regional events like the 1948 flooding.

Major flooding from rapid snowmelt was also observed in other major watersheds in the region, including the Fraser River which inundated portions of the Vancouver area leaving 1500 people homeless. The Snake River, which is the largest tributary to the Columbia, and its watershed did not experience widespread flooding thanks to lower snowpack in East Idaho and far western Wyoming.

== Damage ==
Several cities experienced extensive damage during the 1948 flooding with large rural areas also ending up under water. Many railroad tracks, power, telephone, and telegraph lines were out of service for a period following the flood. Small cities in the Inland Northwest, such as Bonners Ferry, Idaho, Union, Oregon, and Libby, Montana were flooded by the rivers and creeks they sit on. Washed out and flooded roads isolated other areas, such as the Methow Valley in Northern Washington. Flooding in these areas generally began the week of May 23 and lasted for several days.

Floodwaters gradually continued downstream, forcing evacuations around the Tri-Cities as early as May 27 and closing the highway between The Dalles and Cascade Locks in Oregon on the 28th. Despite frequent assurances from officials, levees protecting Vanport, a World War II era housing project, failed, completely destroying the city. Rather than having the neighborhoods rebuilt, this low area between the Columbia River and Columbia Slough is occupied by the Portland International Raceway, a golf course, and some businesses. Vanport remained underwater for several weeks following the levee burst.

Flooding in the Tri-Cities peaked on May 31 with Kennewick taking the brunt of the water because a larger portion of the city lies at a lower elevation compared to Pasco and Richland. While Kennewick's downtown was being cleaned up, many businesses relocated to a temporary building set up for them to continue to operate despite the damage. The Richland Wye, adjacent to Bateman Island and parts of downtown Richland also flooded. Closures on U.S. Route 410 caused problems for commuters, especially people living in Kennewick and Pasco but working on the Hanford Site.

== Response ==
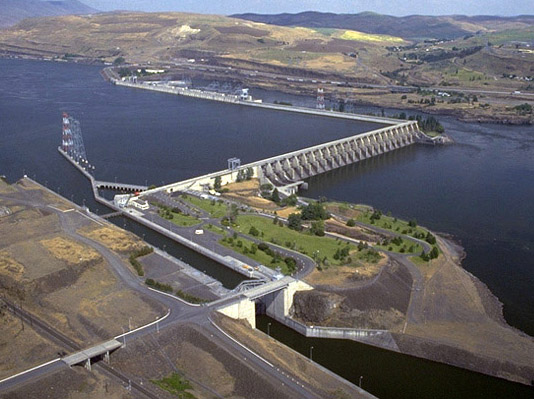
The Dalles Dam on the Columbia River near The Dalles, Oregon

In the United States, National Guard troops deployed throughout the region to assist with disaster relief during and after the flood. President Harry Truman visited Washington on a campaign trip in June 1948. During his visit, he toured flood damaged areas around the Portland metro area and Wenatchee. Truman expressed support for more extensive flood control infrastructure in the Northwest while speaking in Seattle, but a speech he gave in Portland a few days later focused more on development of the river for commerce and focused less on flooding and safety.

Throughout the flooded area, waterways were altered to limit the chances of future flooding. A joint commission involving the United States and Canada had been formed in 1944 to study improvements that could be made to the Columbia River system, and it gained further urgency following the flooding in 1948. The result of this commission was the Columbia River Treaty, which was ratified between the two nations in 1964. Smaller waterways were also altered, such as in Kimberley, British Columbia where Mark Creek was diverted into a flume.

Partially in response to the 1948 floods, the United States Congress passed the Flood Control Act of 1950 funding the construction of several new dams and levee systems in the Columbia River watershed. Multiple dams owned by the United States Army Corps of Engineers resulted from this act including The Dalles Dam, as well as dams owned by sub-national entities like Priest Rapids Dam. As a result of these projects, major flooding on the Columbia River is far less likely.

== In popular culture ==
These songs were inspired by the flood.

- "Here Comes Sunshine", written by Robert Hunter and Jerry Garcia
- Ex"Vanport's Flood", written by Woody Guthrie
