= Lake Wanapum =

Wanapum Lake
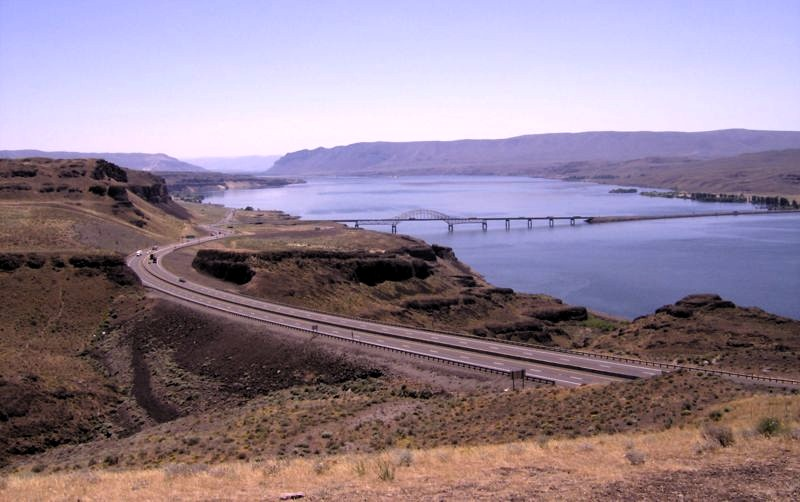
- Vantage Bridge over Lake Wanapum

- Location within Washington (state) Location within the United States
- Location: Kittitas / Grant / Douglas / Chelan counties, Washington
- Coordinates: 46°52′23″N 119°58′19″W
- Type: reservoir
- Primary inflows: Columbia River
- Primary outflows: Columbia River
- Basin countries: United States
- Water volume: 796,000 acre⋅ft (982,000,000 m^{3})
- Surface elevation: 571 ft (174 m)

Wanapum Lake is a reservoir on the Columbia River in the U.S. state of Washington. It was created in 1963 with the construction of Wanapum Dam. It stretches from there upstream to the Rock Island Dam. The lake is named for the Wanapum people.

== See also ==
- List of dams in the Columbia River watershed
