= Vantage, Washington =

- CDP
- Location of Vantage in Washington
- Coordinates: 46°56′40″N 119°59′52″W
- Country: United States
- State: Washington
- County: Kittitas

Area
  - Total: 0.31 sq mi (0.8 km^{2})
  - Land: 0.31 sq mi (0.8 km^{2})
  - Water: 0 sq mi (0.0 km^{2})
- Elevation: 725 ft (221 m)

Population (2020)
  - Total: 54
  - Density: 170/sq mi (67/km^{2})
- Time zone: UTC-8 (Pacific (PST))
  - Summer (DST): UTC-7 (PDT)
- ZIP code: 98950
- Area code: 509
- FIPS code: 53-74200
- GNIS feature ID: 2409504

Vantage is a census-designated place (CDP) in Kittitas County, Washington, United States. The population was 54 at the 2020 census.

== History ==
The area around Vantage has been occupied by the Wanapum Native Americans since prehistory. A number of well-preserved rock-paintings have been found on the cliff walls. They also used the abundant petrified wood in the area for arrowheads and other tools. The site where these petroglyphs were found was inundated by the rising waters behind Wanapum Dam in the 1960s. About 60 of the more than 300 carvings were cut from the basalt cliff face and saved. The nearby Ginkgo Petrified Forest site is one of the most unusual fossil forests in the world, and was designated a National Natural Landmark by the National Park Service in 1965.

In the early part of the 20th century, residents in nearby Ellensburg needed a more direct route when traveling east. A small ferry was established in 1914 to carry vehicle traffic across the Columbia River at Vantage. This ferry was really just a small barge with wooden ramps at either end, it carried only two cars at a time across the river. After several cars (some with occupants still in them) were lost overboard, the state highway department decided to construct a bridge over the Columbia.

In 1927, the 1,640-foot (0.31 mi; 0.50 km) bridge was opened at Vantage. This was an important link in the Sunset Highway, the major east–west thoroughfare in Washington at the time (later U.S. Route 10, now Interstate 90). The construction of the bridge required workers to enter pressurized caissons seventy feet (21 m) under the riverbed via airlocks. Some workers became seriously ill from the effects of the pressure. Once completed, the bridge had a 70-foot (21 m) clearance on the center span, allowing for river traffic to pass under the bridge.

This cantilever bridge served at Vantage for 35 years, succeeded by the current bridge in 1962. The original was dismantled and moved to the crossing at Lyons Ferry, where it stands today as the oldest (98–99 years) extant steel cantilever bridge in Washington, and is listed in the National Register of Historic Places.

With completion of the Wanapum Dam in the early 1960s, the townsite was relocated further up the hill above the rising water to the current location.

== Geography ==
Vantage is located along the Columbia River.

According to the United States Census Bureau, the CDP has a total area of 0.3 square miles (0.8 km^{2}), all of it land.

The original town of Vantage was flooded by the Columbia River when the Wanapum Dam was placed into operation.

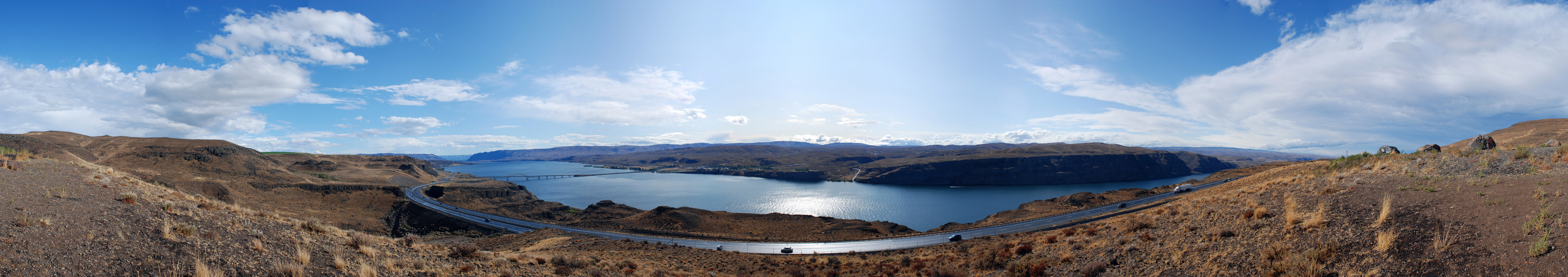
Interstate 90's Vantage crossing of the Columbia River in a 270° panorama from the north; Vantage is at the west end (right) of the bridge.

=== Climate ===
Climate data for Vantage
Month	Jan	Feb	Mar	Apr	May	Jun	Jul	Aug	Sep	Oct	Nov	Dec	Year
Record high °F (°C)	69 (21)	71 (22)	82 (28)	96 (36)	105 (41)	109 (43)	113 (45)	115 (46)	103 (39)	89 (32)	75 (24)	70 (21)	115 (46)
Mean daily maximum °F (°C)	40 (4)	48 (9)	59 (15)	67 (19)	76 (24)	83 (28)	92 (33)	91 (33)	81 (27)	66 (19)	50 (10)	38 (3)	66 (19)
Mean daily minimum °F (°C)	26 (−3)	27 (−3)	32 (0)	38 (3)	46 (8)	53 (12)	58 (14)	56 (13)	47 (8)	37 (3)	30 (−1)	23 (−5)	39 (4)
Record low °F (°C)	−28 (−33)	−24 (−31)	3 (−16)	21 (−6)	24 (−4)	34 (1)	41 (5)	39 (4)	26 (−3)	9 (−13)	−19 (−28)	−19 (−28)	−28 (−33)
Average precipitation inches (mm)	0.92 (23)	0.65 (17)	0.71 (18)	0.57 (14)	0.51 (13)	0.59 (15)	0.27 (6.9)	0.18 (4.6)	0.32 (8.1)	0.60 (15)	1.08 (27)	1.18 (30)	7.58 (191.6)

== Demographics ==
Historical population
Census	Pop.	Note	%±
2000	70		—
2010	74		5.7%
2020	54		−27.0%
U.S. Decennial Census; 1990 2000 2010

Vantage first appeared as a census designated place in the 2000 U.S. census.

=== Racial and ethnic composition ===
Vantage CDP, Washington – Racial and ethnic composition Note: the US Census treats Hispanic/Latino as an ethnic category. This table excludes Latinos from the racial categories and assigns them to a separate category. Hispanics/Latinos may be of any race.
Race / Ethnicity (NH = Non-Hispanic)	Pop 2000	Pop 2010	Pop 2020	% 2000	% 2010	% 2020
White alone (NH)	52	57	25	74.29%	77.03%	46.30%
Black or African American alone (NH)	0	0	0	0.00%	0.00%	0.00%
Native American or Alaska Native alone (NH)	0	0	0	0.00%	0.00%	0.00%
Asian alone (NH)	0	0	0	0.00%	0.00%	0.00%
Native Hawaiian or Pacific Islander alone (NH)	1	0	0	1.43%	0.00%	0.00%
Other race alone (NH)	0	3	0	0.00%	4.05%	0.00%
Mixed race or Multiracial (NH)	1	1	3	1.43%	1.35%	5.56%
Hispanic or Latino (any race)	16	13	26	22.86%	17.57%	48.15%
Total	70	74	54	100.00%	100.00%	100.00%

=== 2000 census ===
As of the census of 2000, there were 70 people, 25 households, and 20 families residing in the CDP. The population density was 219.7 inhabitants per square mile (84.8/km^{2}). There were 39 housing units at an average density of 122.4 units per square mile (47.3 units/km^{2}). The racial makeup of the CDP was 22.86% White, 1.43% Pacific Islander, 2.86% from other races, and 11.43% from two or more races. Hispanic or Latino of any race were 84.29% of the population. Besides these populations, approximately 2,000 agricultural workers live in the Vantage area, and approximately 72.8% of are migratory.

There were 25 households, out of which 28.0% had children under the age of 18 living with them, 68.0% were married couples living together, 4.0% had a female householder with no husband present, and 20.0% were non-families. 20.0% of all households were made up of individuals, and none had someone living alone who was 65 years of age or older. The average household size was 2.80 and the average family size was 3.25.

In the CDP, the population was spread out, with 24.3% under the age of 18, 15.7% from 18 to 24, 21.4% from 25 to 44, 32.9% from 45 to 64, and 5.7% who were 65 years of age or older. The median age was 36 years. For every 100 females, there were 105.9 males. For every 100 females age 18 and over, there were 103.8 males.

The median income for a household in the CDP was $26,250, and the median income for a family was $43,750. Males had a median income of $26,250 versus $0 for females. The per capita income for the CDP was $17,605.

== Business and recreation ==
=== Business ===
There is a gas station, a restaurant, a coffee shop and a private RV park/campground in Vantage. The Wild Horse Wind Farm, owned by Puget Sound Energy, is located on ridge tops near Vantage.

=== Recreation ===
Vantage is known for Ginkgo Petrified Forest State Park and its associated Wanapum Recreational Area, as a base camp for those attending nearby Gorge Amphitheatre, and its rock climbing.

Rock climbing is one of the area's more popular forms of outdoor recreation and mostly takes place in Echo Basin, part of Frenchman Coulee. Climbers use the basalt columns typical to the desert rimrock in the area.

Climbers started visiting as early as the 1950s and 1960s but the area was not popularized and publicized until the 1980s. With this came a great increase in route development. Today the area holds over 400 established routes (both traditionally protected and bolted) ranging in difficulty from 5.0-5.13c, and sees visitors almost year-round.
