= Priest Rapids =

Section of the Columbia River in Washington State

Coordinates: 46°45′17″N 119°58′20″W

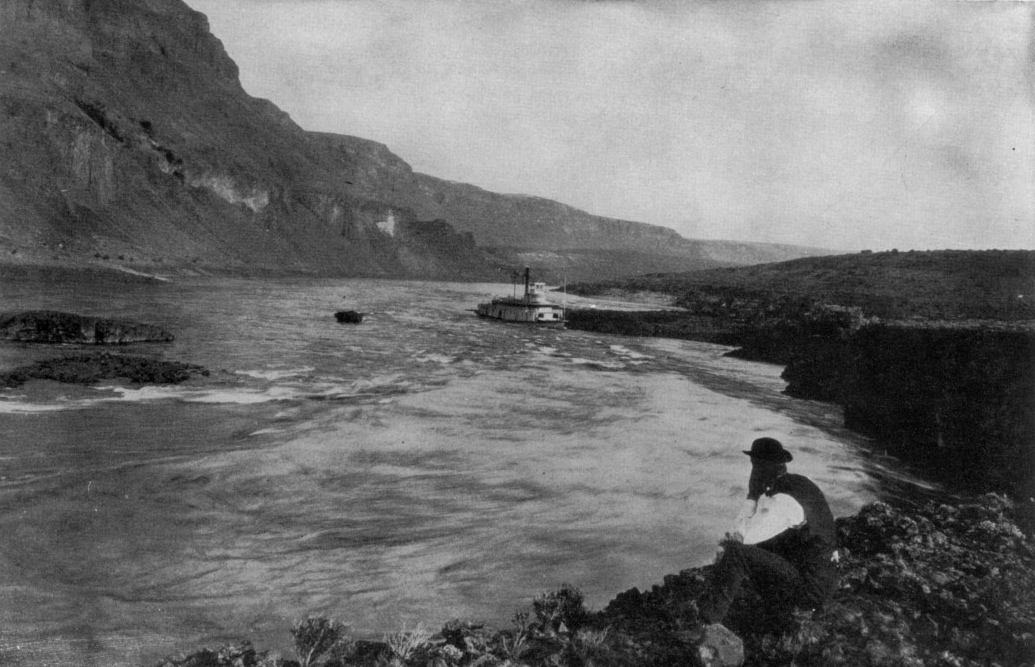
Priest Rapids in 1884.

Priest Rapids was a narrow, fast-flowing stretch of the Columbia River, located in the central region of the U.S. state of Washington. It was flooded by the construction of the Priest Rapids Dam in the 1950s.

Before the dam's construction, the river dropped 20 feet (6 m) over a short distance. In total Priest Rapids consisted of seven separate cataracts along a 9-mile (14 km) stretch, over which the river dropped 72 feet (22 m) altogether.

It was given the name Priest Rapids by Alexander Ross of the Pacific Fur Company in 1811, for a native shaman. Ross wrote of his visit to the "strong and rocky rapid" where he met a man "called Haquilaugh, which signifies … priest." Haquilaugh was an influential Wanapum leader, for whom Ross gave the rapids its English name.

At Priest Rapids the Columbia River narrowed and flowed quickly, making it an ideal salmon fishing site. There were several rapids and fishing sites, and a dozen or so Wanapum villages along the west bank of the Columbia River at Priest Rapids.

Priest Rapids Dam, built in the 1950s, submerged Priest Rapids, taking advantage of the river's drop for hydroelectric power production. Thus today there are no rapids at Priest Rapids.

== See also ==
- List of rapids of the Columbia River
