= Vanport, Oregon =

Former city in Oregon, U.S.

- Former city destroyed by flood
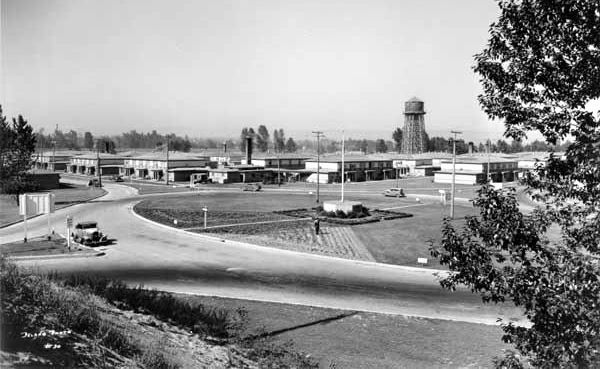
- Vanport in 1943, five years before the flood

- Location within the state of Oregon
- Coordinates: 45°36′07″N 122°42′00″W
- Country: United States
- State: Oregon
- County: Multnomah
- Elevation: 23 ft (7.0 m)
- Time zone: UTC-8 (Pacific)
  - Summer (DST): UTC-7 (Pacific)
- GNIS feature ID: 1128512

Vanport, sometimes referred to as Vanport City or Kaiserville, was a city of wartime public housing in Multnomah County, Oregon, United States, between the contemporary Portland city boundary and the Columbia River. It was destroyed in the 1948 Columbia River flood and not rebuilt. It sat on what is currently the site of Delta Park and the Portland International Raceway.

== History ==
Vanport construction began in August 1942 to house the workers at the wartime Kaiser Shipyards in Portland and Vancouver, Washington. Vanport—a portmanteau of "Vancouver" and "Portland"—was home to 40,000 people, about 40 percent of them African-American, making it Oregon's second-largest city at the time, and the largest public housing project in the nation. After the war, Vanport lost more than half of its population, dropping to 18,500, as many wartime workers left the area. However, there was also an influx of returning World War II veterans. In order to attract veterans and their families, the Housing Authority of Portland (HAP) opened a college named the Vanport Extension Center; the school would eventually be renamed Portland State University.

Vanport was dramatically destroyed at 4:05 p.m. on May 30, 1948, when a 200-foot (60 m) section of a railroad berm holding back the Columbia River collapsed during a flood, killing 15 people. The city was underwater by nightfall, leaving around 18,000 of its inhabitants homeless.

=== Inhabitants ===
The city was a hub of transient laborers from all corners of the country; few residents had any long-term connections with each other and little opportunity or interest to build them. The temporary nature of the new city contributed to an overall sense of insecurity and anxiety among residents. The lack of businesses and recreation opportunities contributed to a sense of distrust, and the relative isolation of the largely male workforce meant there was little demand for community institutions such as a newspaper or high school.

By 1943–44, families living in Vanport were moving out at the rate of 100 a day. A questionnaire mailed to 1,000 former Vanport families, selected randomly from the approximately 3,000 families who had left by then, asked, among other things, why they had moved to Vanport in the first place. About 230 people answered this question. The top reason given for choosing the Portland–Vancouver shipyards was that "they thought it their duty to go into defense work". The second-ranked reason was a desire for a better job, and the third, higher wages. However, the situation changed when the war ended in 1945. The Housing Authority of Portland (HAP) then sought to attract World War II veterans who needed housing, a community to raise their families, and higher education through the Servicemen's Readjustment Act (G.I. Bill). The establishment of a college at Vanport in 1946 was a key part of the strategy to keep Vanport a thriving Oregon community.

=== Race relations ===
The establishment of Vanport coincided with an unprecedented influx of African-Americans into Oregon, attracted to work in newly federally-desegregated wartime defence industries. Due to exclusionary racial laws, the state had a population of fewer than 1,800 Black people in 1940; by 1946 more than 15,000 lived in the Portland area, mostly in Vanport and other segregated housing districts. One prewar observer, Portland Urban League secretary Edwin C. Berry, described Portland as a " 'northern' city with a 'southern' exposure", arguing that the city shared with southern cities "traditions, attitudes, and things interracial in character." Berry argued that prior to the war the city exhibited remarkably unprogressive racial attitudes.

The hastily constructed wartime development's social and cultural mores had little in common with Portland as a whole. Vanport's immigrants imported their particular brands of racism from throughout the country. White migrants from the South were the most vocal in opposing the degree of integration that HAP dictated for schools, buses and work sites. The Authority was largely unsympathetic to these complaints and at no time was de jure segregation imposed on any of Vanport's facilities. When police were called because Black men were dancing with white women at a local event, only the white women were detained and warned that their conduct might lead to a race riot.

HAP never had any explicit policy advocating segregation; nonetheless, for various reasons de facto segregation was the norm. Whites complained when placed near "Black" areas, and segregation of Vanport by neighborhood might as well have been enforced legally. Only in 1944 were complaints raised about the segregation situation in the city. Reacting to the criticism—and pressure from Eleanor Roosevelt—by April 1944, HAP began placing incoming Black people into the "white" areas of the settlement. However, word quickly spread and 63 white residents quickly signed a petition demanding a reversal of the policy. Entire buildings were free in the "Black" areas of town, they argued, and after opponents of the integration plan appeared at a HAP meeting the authority decided to resume its previous policies.

The unprecedented level of integration and lack of any major incidents of racially-motivated violence or severe tensions did not mean there were no problems. Tensions between Black and white communities were still a part of Vanport life as well as a problem in relating to Portland. A 1943–44 study published in the American Sociological Review indicates that the top five complaints from Vanport residents included "negroes and whites in same neighborhood", "negroes and whites in same school", and "discrimination against Vanport people by Portlanders".

Although some of Portland's Black people lived in 53 of the city's 60 census tracts before the war, about half were concentrated in two tracts east of the Willamette River and north of the east–west centerline of the city. After the war, much of Portland's Black community remained centered in northeastern parts of the city.

The 1948 Vanport Flood parallels the 2005 Hurricane Katrina disaster in New Orleans. In both cases, public officials led the population to believe that the damage would be slight, and in both cases the government response to the disaster was harshly criticized. Critics attributed the poor response, in both cases, to racist attitudes on the part of officials, who pointedly neglected to respond appropriately to the destruction of a community that had a relatively large number of Black residents. However, many dispute the role of racism, pointing to the transformation of Vanport by the influx of World War II veterans and their families and official commitment to the area shown by the establishment at Vanport of the only state college in the greater Portland metropolitan area. At the time of the flood, one-third of Vanport residents were Black.

=== Flood ===
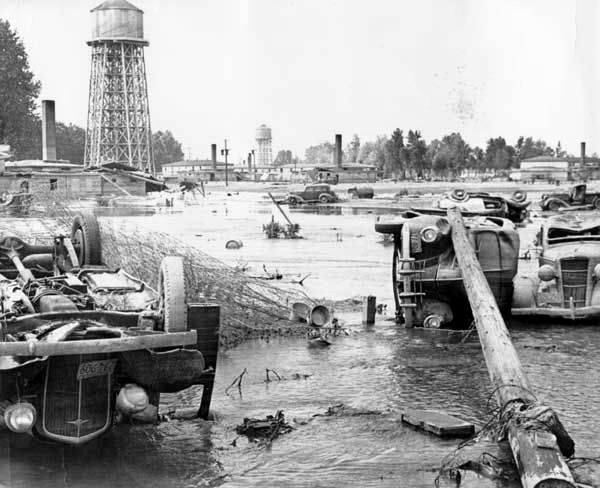
Overturned cars in the aftermath of the Vanport flood, 1948

Vanport was especially vulnerable to flooding, since it was built on reclaimed lowlands along the Columbia River. The Columbia Basin is a massive area encompassing seven U.S. states as well as British Columbia. The previous winter snowpack was 75 to 135% of normal. Above normal temperatures accompanied two major rainstorms May 19 to 23, 1948, and again May 26 to 29. In the days prior to the flood, rainfall combined with meltwater swelled the many tributaries that feed the Columbia River, creating high water levels that had not been seen since the record flood of 1894. The lowest point in Vanport was about 15 feet (4.6 m) below the water level in the river.

A radio alert was issued the night before the flood, and some residents moved their belongings into attics and upper floors. Few imagined the possible extent to which the water levels would rise. Another contributing factor to the lack of voluntary evacuation was that many residents relied solely on public transportation.

On the morning of Memorial Day, May 30, 1948, the Housing Authority of Portland issued the following statement: "Remember: Dikes are safe at present. You will be warned if necessary. You will have time to leave. Don't get excited."

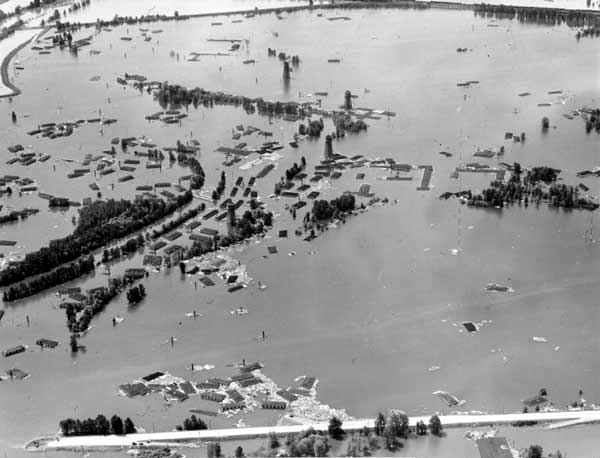
Aerial view of the Vanport flood, looking west from North Denver Avenue on June 15, 1948

At about 4:17 p.m. the Spokane, Portland and Seattle Railway berm burst, sending a 10-foot (3 m) wall of water into the area of Vanport College. According to a historical marker, the break happened at an old railroad cut that had been filled in. Because of the numerous sloughs and backwaters in the area, the progress of the flood was delayed about 30 minutes, giving residents more time to escape.

An emergency siren began to sound shortly after the initial breach, and residents began to head up North Denver Avenue to higher ground.

At the time of the flood, the population of Vanport was down to about 18,500 people. Because of the holiday, many residents were away from their homes for the day. These factors contributed to the low loss of life: officially, there were only 15 deaths. Nonetheless, the city was a complete loss.

On June 11, 1948, President Harry S. Truman flew to Portland to examine the damage. The recovery effort was assisted by Vanport College and the Red Cross.

=== Legacy ===
Vanport led Portland and Oregon in integrating Black people. "The first black teachers and policemen in the state were hired in Vanport during the war years". One of those Black teachers, Martha Jordan, later became the first Black teacher hired by Portland Public Schools.

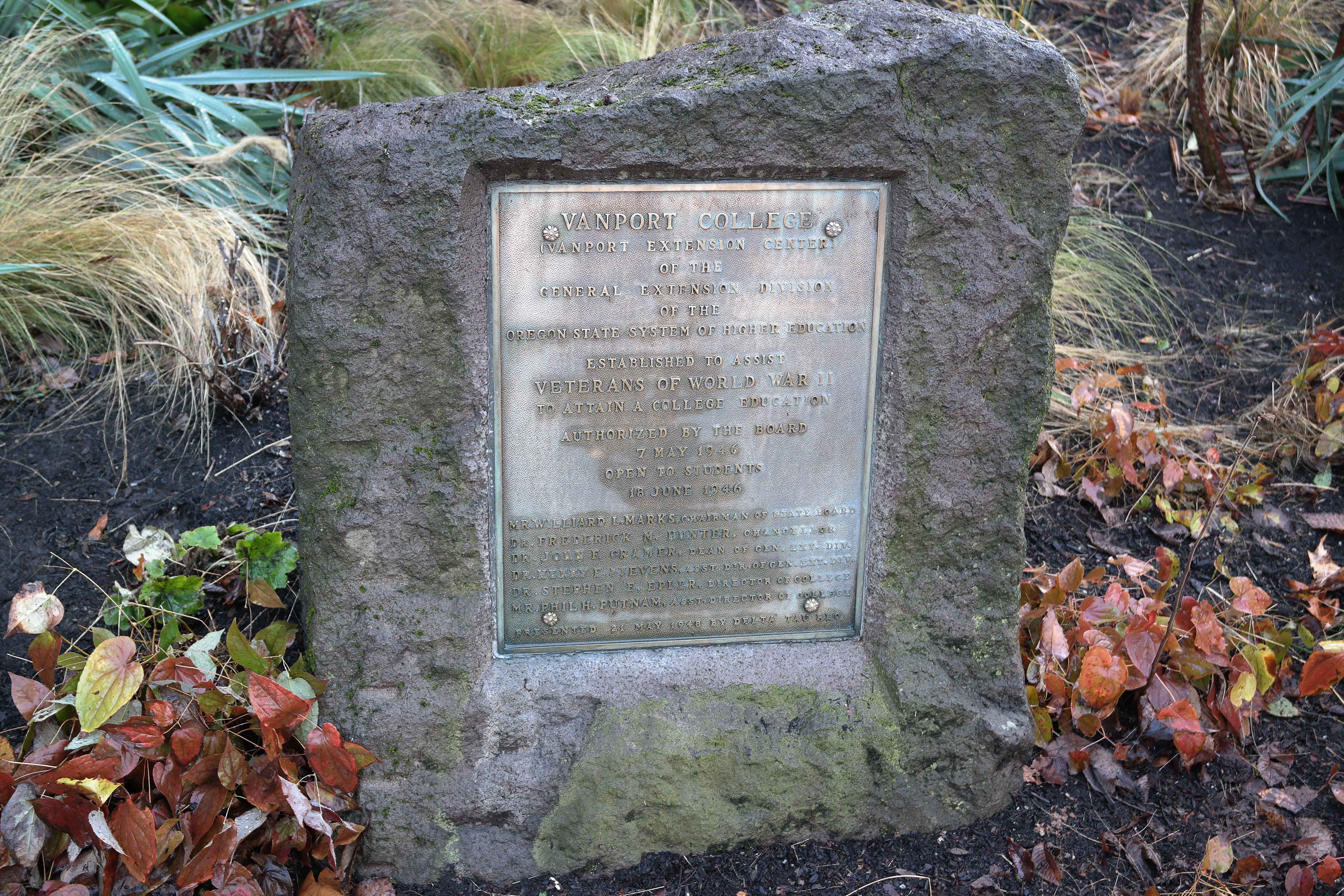
Vanport College plaque near Lincoln Hall at Portland State University

Vanport's destruction eased the integration of a large African-American population into North and Northeast Portland. Indeed, some Black leaders argued that the flood was ultimately beneficial for the city's Black community. Vanport, argued National Urban League director Lester Granger, was a "nasty, segregated ghetto" where "negroes lived in the same patterns as they did in the South." The flood that wiped out the district, he continued, was a benefit in that it allowed Black people to further integrate into Portland's society.

To prevent future incidents, Congress enacted the Flood Control Act of 1950 which spawned projects such as the Priest Rapids Dam. The flood also resulted in the 1961 Columbia River Treaty and later the construction of Libby Dam in Montana.

The loss of Vanport is considered a factor in the eventual closing of the Jantzen Beach Amusement Park on Hayden Island in 1970. Several acres of the former city became "West Delta Park" which is now the Portland International Raceway. The Vanport Extension Center refused to close after the flood disaster and quickly reopened in downtown Portland. Dubbed by a national magazine "The College that Wouldn't Die", it became present-day Portland State University.

Beginning in 2015, the Vanport Mosaic Festival has been held annually to commemorate the city and its history.
