= Grant County Public Utility District =

Public utility district in Washington, U.S.

Coordinates: 47°19′14″N 119°33′11″W

- Founded: 1938
- Headquarters: Ephrata, Washington, U.S.
- Products: Public utility
- Website: www.grantpud.org

Public Utility District No. 2 of Grant County, or Grant County PUD, is a public utility district in north central Washington state. It is owned by its customers and governed by a Board of Commissioners elected by the customer-owners. Though it is not regulated by another governmental unit, a PUD is, by state statute, a nonprofit corporation. PUDs must comply with state regulations for municipal corporations. The local customer-owner of the PUD receives benefits in the form of reduced rates for service. Grant County PUD operates two hydroelectric projects, Priest Rapids Dam and Wanapum Dam. In addition to these, the PUD also operates part of the Nine Canyon Wind Project.

== History ==
Grant County PUD was formed by popular vote after petitions from the Grange delegation on November 8, 1938. The PUD held its first organizational meeting on December 21, 1938, in Hartline.

In the fall and winter of 1938, the Commission authorized W.S. McCrea Co., a consulting engineer, to begin necessary action to acquire properties from Washington Water Power Company, and others, by purchase or condemnation. To complete the process, the Commission also authorized the acquisition of WWP facilities by purchase or condemnation as well as the issuance of revenue bonds with a $300,000 limit.

On January 20, 1942, Grant County PUD purchased the Coulee City Grant County Power Company for $19,753.73. That same year on January 30, 1942, Grant PUD purchased Soap Lake Utilities for $25,046.50, and in May moved the main office to Soap Lake.

On June 14, 1945, Grant County PUD took over operation of Washington Water Power (WWP) Company facilities in Grant County. In the process, Grant County PUD retained several WWP employees and jumped the number of employees from 4 to 17. That same month, Grant County PUD headquarters moved again to Ephrata.

== See also ==
- Moses Lake, Washington
- Grant County, Washington
- Ephrata, Washington
