= Wanapum =

Wánapam

Regions with significant populations
- Columbia Plateau (Washington, United States)

Languages
- English, historically Sahaptin

Religion
- Christianity, Waashat

Related ethnic groups
- Other Sahaptin peoples, such as the Yakama

The Wanapum (also called Wanapam; Sahaptin: Wánapam) are a Sahaptin-speaking Native American people who live along the Columbia River in Washington state, United States, primarily in the area around Priest Rapids. About 60 Wanapum still live near the present day site of Priest Rapids Dam.

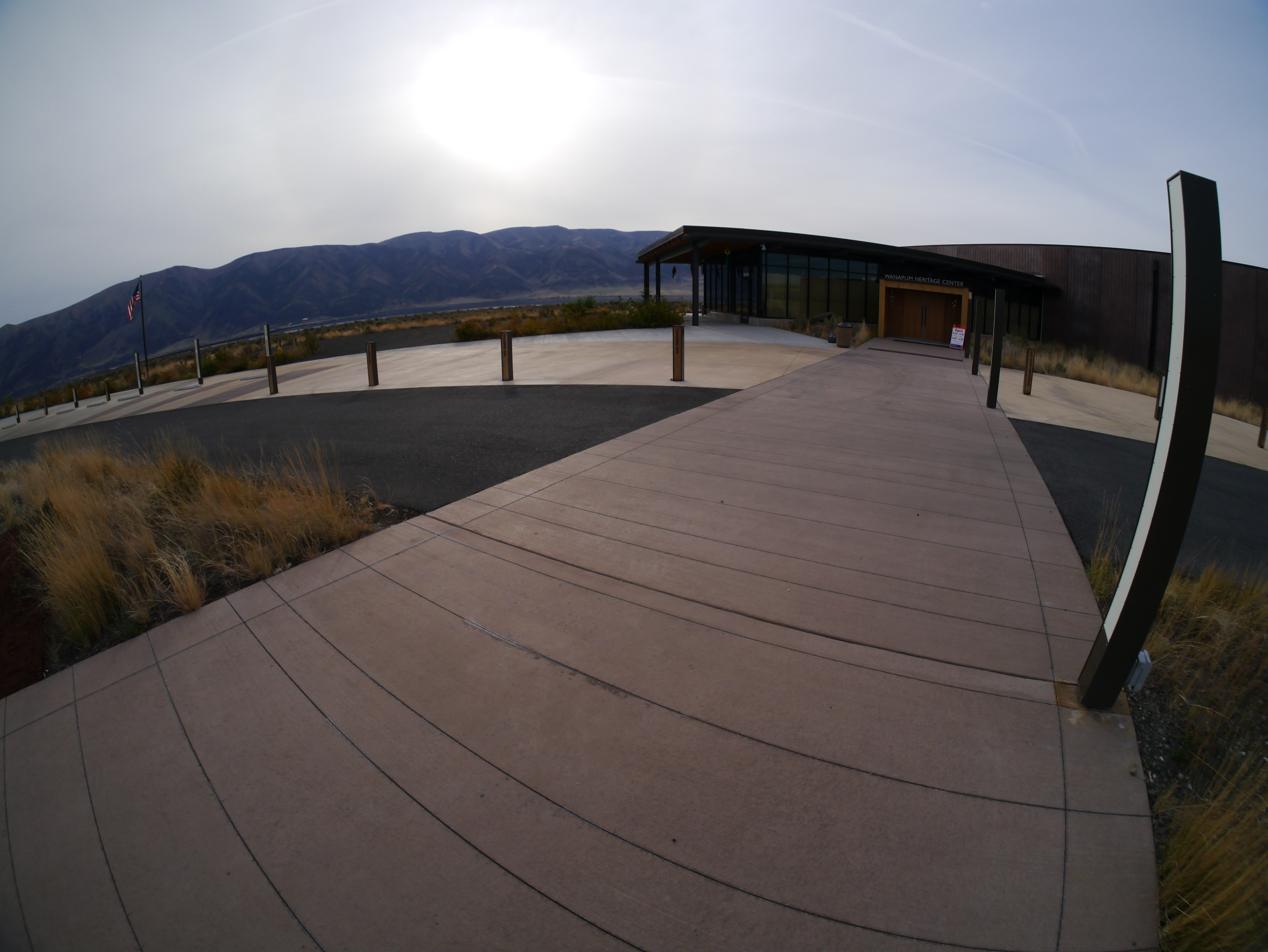
Wanapum Heritage Center on the Columbia River

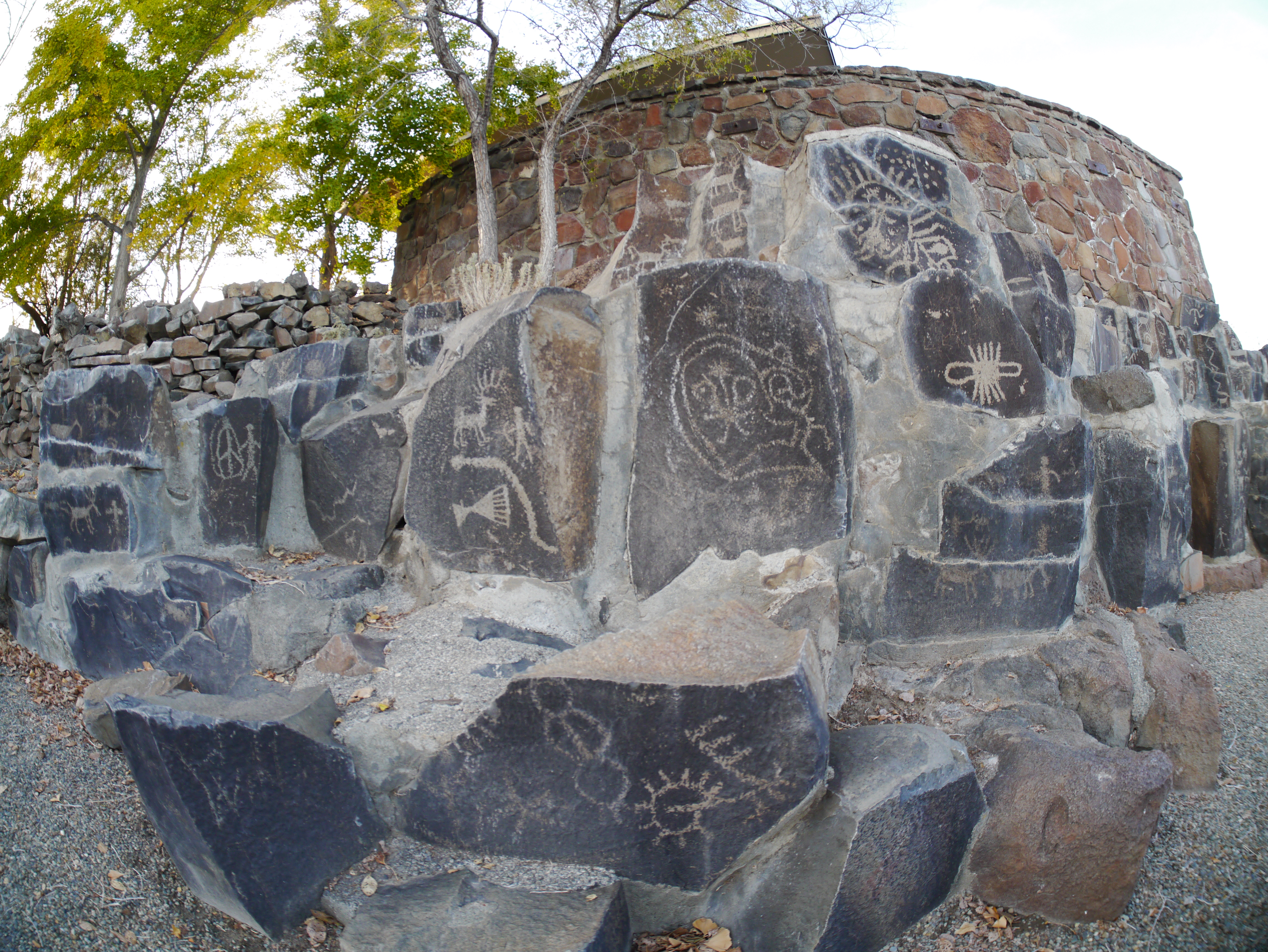
Petroglyphs on display at Ginkgo Petrified Forest State Park, Washington

== Name ==
The name "Wanapum" comes from their name in the Sahaptin language, Wánapam. It means 'river people', from wána 'river' + -pam 'people.'

== Geography ==
The Wanapum inhabited the area along the Columbia River from present day Pasco, Washington at the mouth of the Snake River, upstream to the area around Priest Rapids. Their principal village, P'ná, was located two miles downstream of the Priest Rapids Dam. In 1936, Verne Ray recorded four other former villages at the current location of the dam, each about a mile upriver from the other. At the time of Ray's recording, the village Sháp'tilik, located at what would become the Priest Rapids Dam, was still occupied by about forty people in two longhouses. The Priest Rapids Longhouse was built there in the 1950s, and about 8-10 Wanapam families still remained at the site in the 1990s.

== History ==
The Wanapum people are similar to the other native inhabitants of the Columbia River Plateau. The tribe made houses from tule and cut over 300 petroglyphs into the basalt cliffs. In 1805, according to the journals of the Lewis and Clark Expedition, the Wanapum, led by their chief Cutssahnem, greeted the expedition and treated its members well, sharing food and entertainment. Captain Clark’s journals provide descriptions of their dwellings, clothing, and physical characteristics.

In the 1800s, a new Native religion, called Washane, Washani or "Dreamer Religion", was created by a spiritual leader of the Wanapum named Smohalla. Adherents to this religion believed that the white man would disappear, if rituals and traditional life was adhered to; instead of participating in armed conflicts, the people prayed. Whether due to this religion or for other reasons, the tribe never fought white settlers, did not sign a treaty with them, and as a result retained no federally recognized land rights.

In 1942 Franklin Matthias allowed about 30 Wanapum to remain in their winter camp, with access to their customary fishing ground in the middle of the federal reservation for the Hanford Engineer Works (part of the Manhattan Project), and provided daily trucks to transport them from their winter camp on the Columbia River. He did not believe that their loyalty could be questioned. But after WWII they were sealed off from graves and cultural sites on the Hanford site.

In 1953 the construction of the Priest Rapids Dam and the Wanapum Dam flooded the riverbanks where the Wanapum had lived in traditional tule houses.

== Heritage ==
About 60 Wanapum petroglyphs were blasted from the rock before being flooded; they may be viewed at Ginkgo Petrified Forest State Park.

The Wanapum Heritage Center Museum displays artifacts of the time before the dams, while the Wanapum River Patrol keeps watch over the ancestral lands, monitoring locations of special significance to the Wanapum to protect those places from depredation, and also providing information to visitors.

The indigenist Washat Dreamers Religion that founded by Wanapum Smohalla in 1850 is still practiced by some members of other tribes.
