= Wanapum Dam =

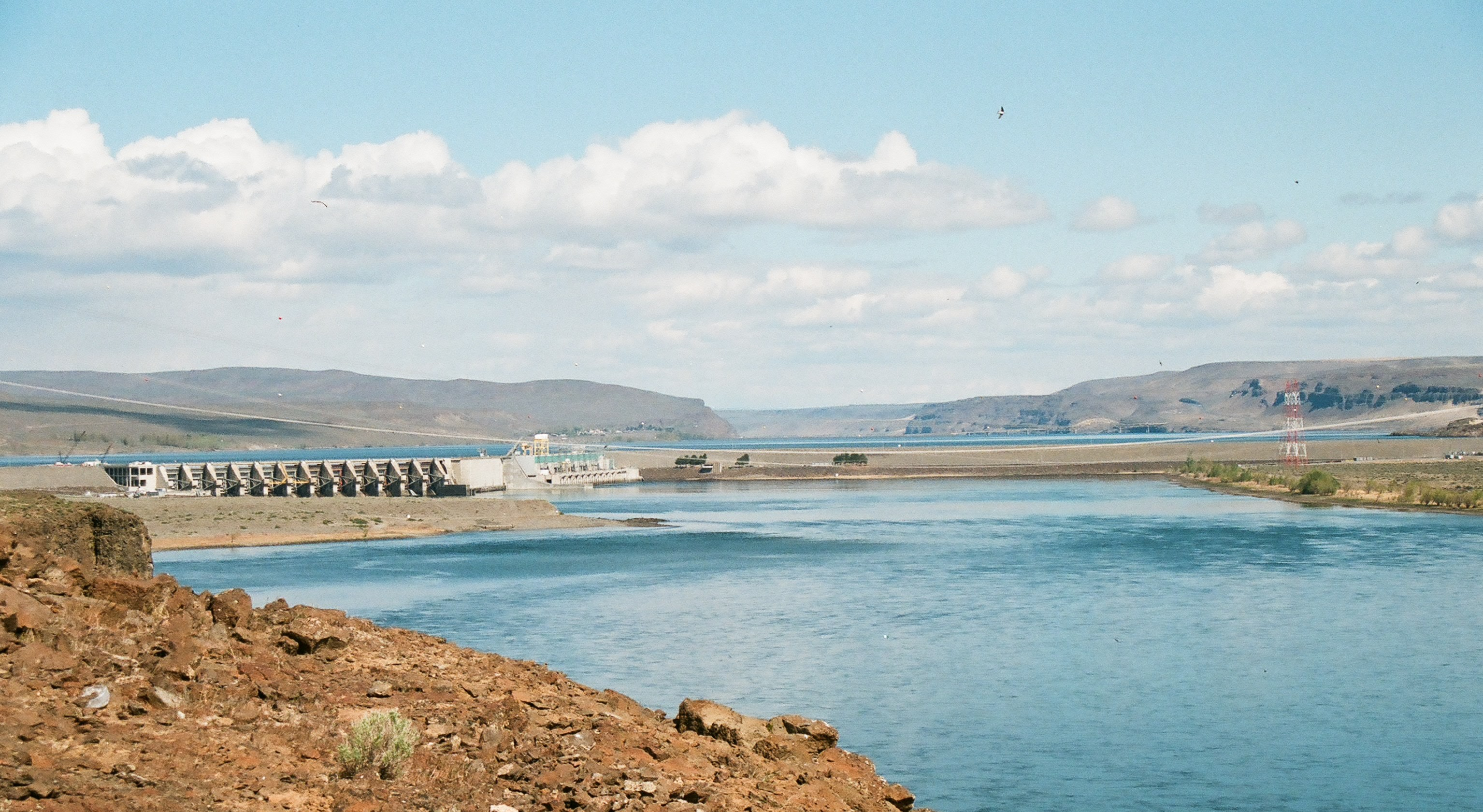
- Dam viewed from downstream on the west bank
- Interactive map of Wanapum Dam
- Official name: Wanapum Dam
- Location: Grant / Kittitas counties, Washington
- Coordinates: 46.875213°N 119.971004°W
- Construction began: 1959
- Opening date: 1963
- Construction cost: US$93,277,690

Dam and spillways
- Impounds: Columbia River
- Height: 185 feet (56 m)
- Length: 8,320 feet (2,540 m)

Reservoir
- Creates: Lake Wanapum
- Total capacity: 796,000 acre-feet (982,000,000 m^{3})

Power Station
- Commission date: 1963
- Turbines: 10 x 104 MW Kaplan-type
- Installed capacity: 1,185 megawatts (1,589,000 hp)

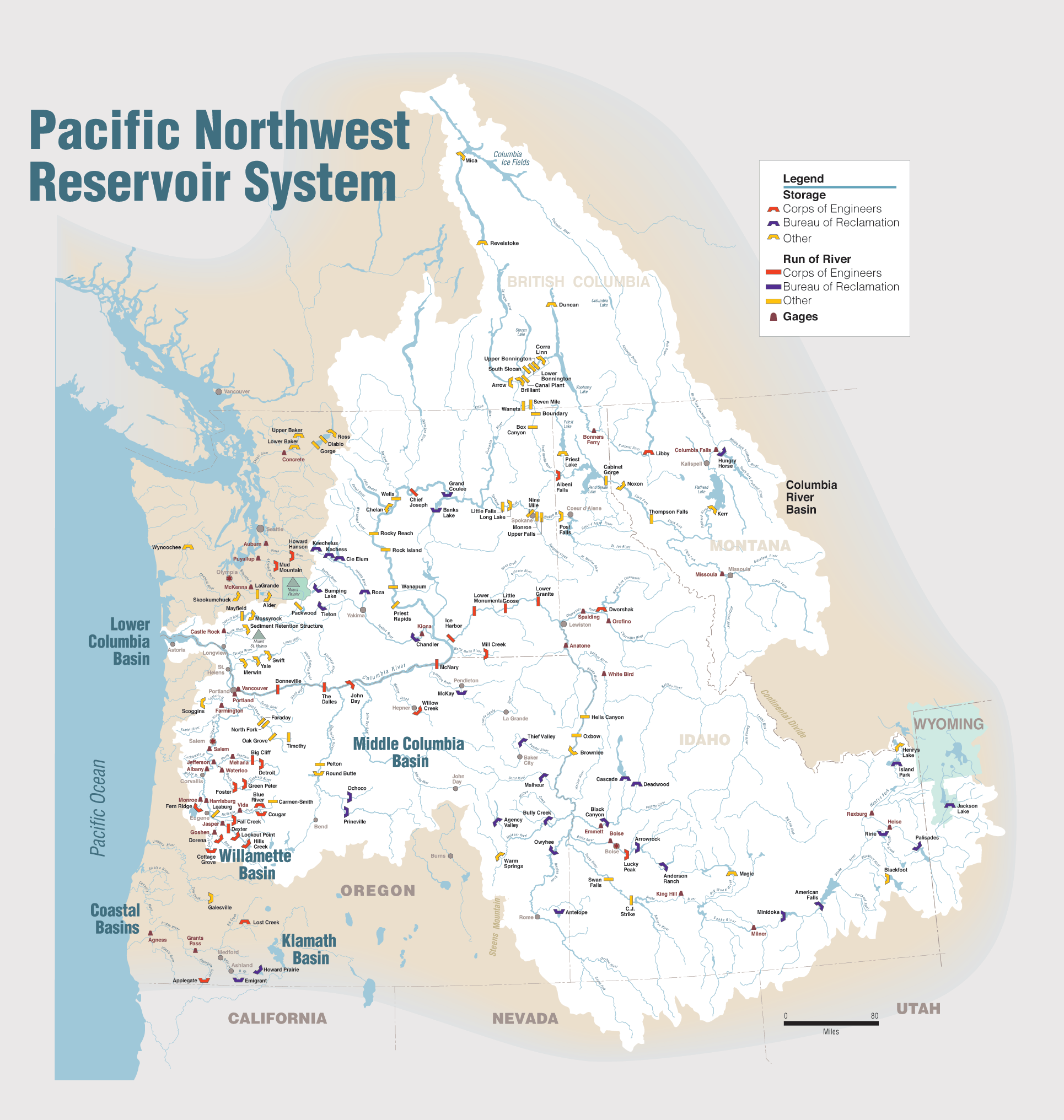
Pacific Northwest River System

Wanapum Dam is a run-of-the-river hydroelectric project located on the Columbia River downstream (south) from Vantage, Washington where Interstate 90 crosses the Columbia from Grant County into Kittitas County. It is owned by the Grant County Public Utility District. Its reservoir is named Lake Wanapum.

The dam, and its lake, are named after the Wanapum Indians. The dam has a rated capacity of 1,185 megawatts and annually generates over 4 million megawatt-hours.

== History ==
The Wanapum dam was originally licensed in 1955 for a period of 50 years. Construction was initiated in 1959 with initial beneficial operation in 1963. The initial license expired in 2005, after which the Grant County PUD operated the dam on yearly license extensions while negotiations for license extension proceeded. The Federal Energy Regulatory Commission approved a license extension of 44 years for both the Wanapum dam and the downstream Priest Rapids Dam on April 17, 2008. The license extension was conditioned upon programs to achieve the following goals:

- modernize the power generation capability of the dam
- monitor water quality
- improve wildlife habitat
- protect nearly 700 Wanapum Tribe archaeological sites in the vicinity
- enhance recreation with new campsites, picnic areas and trails

=== Spillway crack ===
On February 27, 2014, a 2-inch (5 cm) wide crack was discovered by inspection divers on one of the 65 feet (20 m) tall concrete monoliths that make up the spillway of the dam. A spokesman for the Grant County PUD indicated that the level of the water was to be lowered by 26 feet (8 m) over a period of days to "reduce the pressure on the spillway while inspectors investigate".

During the time that the water level was lowered for repairs, all beaches and water access in the area above the dam were closed to protect sensitive cultural resources and help to ensure public safety. Public access was restored in the spring of 2015.

After an 11-week inspection, the primary reason for the crack was determined to be a mathematical error during the pre-construction design of the dam. Repairs of the cracked monolith and the strengthening of the remaining monoliths were made in 2014–2015. The $61 million fix used steel cabling and rods to stitch the dam to the bedrock underneath.

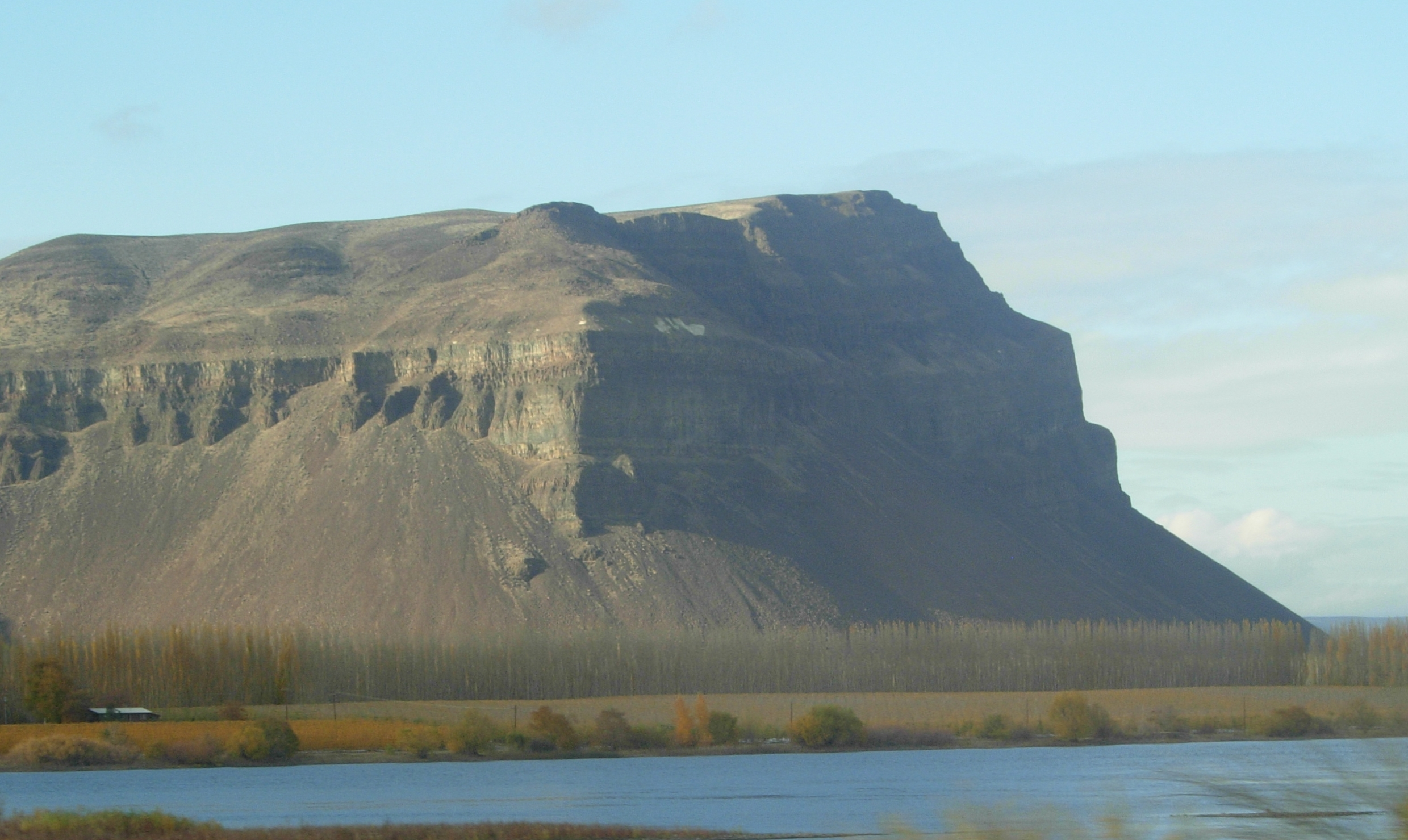
Basalt bluff over the Columbia River near Wanapum Dam

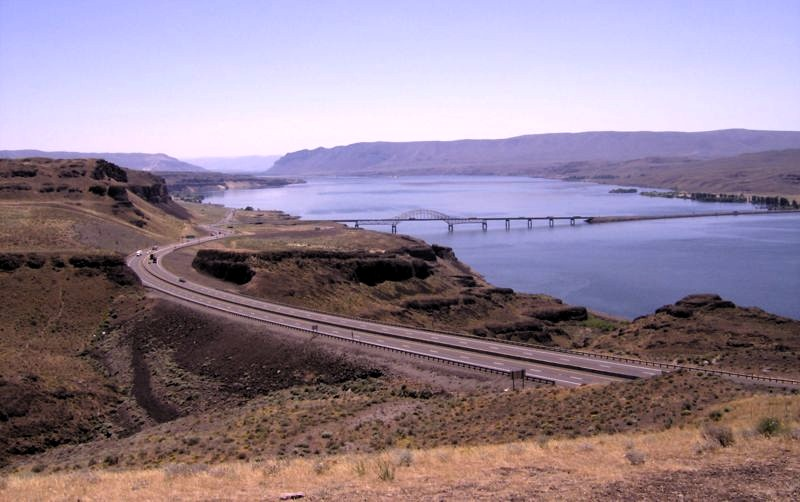
Vantage Bridge crossing Wanapum Lake

== See also ==
- List of dams in the Columbia River watershed
- Sensor fish, a device used to study the impact of fish travelling through the Wanapum and other dams
