= Bass Reeves =

American lawman (1838–1910)

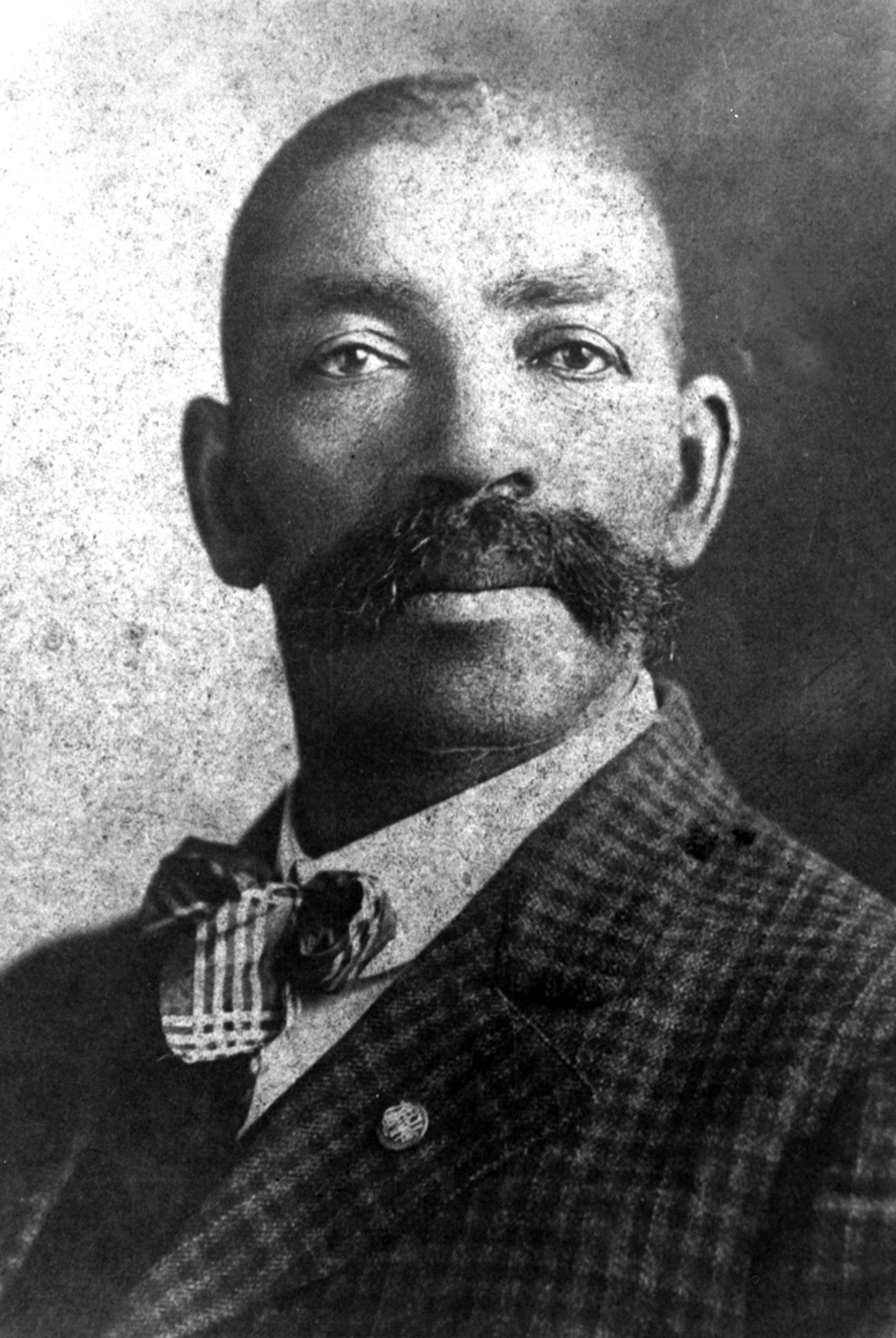
- Born: July 1838; Crawford County, Arkansas, U.S.
- Died: January 12, 1910 (aged 71); Muskogee, Oklahoma, U.S.
- Occupations: Farmer, rancher, railroad agent, tracker, scout, interpreter, deputy United States Marshal, and policeman
- Years active: 35 years as a law enforcement officer
- Known for: More than 3,000 arrests
- Height: 6 ft 2 in (1.88 m) at age 30
- Opponents: Jim Webb; Wiley Bear; John Bruner; Frank Buck; Ned Christie; Belle Starr
- Spouses: Jennie Haynes (m. 1864; died 1896) Winnie Sumter (m. 1900)
- Children: 11
- Police career
- Country: United States Government
- Branch: U.S. Marshal
- Service years: 1875–1910
- Rank: Deputy
- Other work: Muskogee police officer

Bass Reeves (July 1838 – January 12, 1910) was a deputy U.S. Marshal, gunfighter, farmer, scout, tracker, and railroad agent who escaped from slavery. He spoke the languages of several Native American tribes including Cherokee, Choctaw, Chickasaw, Seminole, and Muscogee. Reeves was one of the first black Deputy U.S. Marshals west of the Mississippi River, mostly working in the Indian Territory. Reeves is credited with more than 3,000 arrests during his career and with killing twenty men in the line of duty.

Reeves was born into slavery in Crawford County, Arkansas. His family was enslaved by Arkansas state legislator William Steele Reeves. During the American Civil War, his enslavers fought for the Confederacy. At some point, Reeves escaped and fled to Indian Territory, where he learned American Indian languages and customs, as well as tracking and survival skills. He eventually became a farmer and rancher.

In 1875, Reeves was hired as a deputy U.S. Marshal at age 37. Reeves was well acquainted with the Indian Territory and served there for over 32 years as a peace officer, covering over 75,000 square miles in what is now Oklahoma. He accidentally shot his cook, William Leach, which led to the court case United States vs. Bass Reeves, for which he was acquitted. His first wife Jennie died in 1896. In 1902, Reeves had to arrest his son, Benjamin "Bennie" Reeves, who was charged with murdering his wife, Castella Brown. Bennie was found guilty by a jury on January 22, 1903, in Muskogee. The presiding judge was C. W. Raymond. Bennie was sentenced to the U.S. prison at Fort Leavenworth, Kansas, for his natural life. Bennie was released after eleven years in prison and lived out the rest of his life as a model citizen. (Note: Indian Territory comprised most of what became Eastern Oklahoma on November 16, 1907, when Oklahoma became a state. Reeves's former position as a deputy U.S. Marshal was abolished at that time, so he became an officer with the Muskogee Police Department, where he served for two years until he was forced to resign because of his declining health.)

Reeves's weapons of choice were the Winchester Models 1873 and 1892. Both rifles used cartridges (commonly .44-40) compatible with contemporary handguns, allowing him to carry a single type of ammunition. He also carried a shotgun and briefly used an 1873 Colt Single Action Army "Peacemaker" in .45 Colt. He tracked and killed outlaw Jim Webb, who had murdered over eleven people. Another outlaw Reeves encountered was murderer and horse thief Wiley Bear. Reeves rounded him up along with his gang, which included John Simmons and Sam Lasly. Reeves was involved in a gunfight with the Creek desperado Frank Buck, whom he shot and killed.

Reeves has been portrayed in popular media, including television shows, films, novels, poems, and books. He was also inducted into the Texas Trail of Fame. A bronze statue of Reeves was erected in Pendergraft Park in Fort Smith, Arkansas, and the Bass Reeves Memorial Bridge in Oklahoma was named after the lawman. A life-size statue of Reeves was erected and unveiled by the Three Rivers Museum on January 11, 2025, in Muskogee, Oklahoma.

== Early life ==
Reeves was born into slavery in Crawford County, Arkansas, in 1838. He was named after his grandfather, Bass Washington. Reeves and his family were owned by Arkansas state legislator William Steele Reeves. When Bass was eight, in about 1846, William Reeves moved to Grayson County, Texas, near present-day Pottsboro in the Peters Colony. It appears plausible that Reeves, still enslaved, was retained as a servant by William Steele Reeves's son, Colonel George R. Reeves, a Texan sheriff, legislator, and one-time Speaker of the Texas House of Representatives. When the American Civil War began, George Reeves joined the Confederate States Army, taking Bass with him. According to the Reeves family, at some time between 1861 and 1862, Bass attacked George Reeves following an argument during a poker card game. He escaped to Indian Territory which is now Kansas and Oklahoma. Once there, he became acquainted with the Cherokee, Cree, and Seminole, learning their customs, languages, and tracking skills. The Emancipation Proclamation gave Reeves his freedom. As a freedman, Reeves returned to Arkansas and farmed near Van Buren.

== Career ==
Reeves and his family farmed until 1875, when Isaac C. Parker was appointed federal judge for the Indian Territory. Parker appointed James F. Fagan as U.S. marshal, directing him to hire 200 deputy U.S. marshals. Fagan had heard about Reeves, who knew the Territory and could speak several Native languages. He recruited him as a deputy. Reeves, age 37, was among the first Black deputies to serve west of the Mississippi River.

Reeves was assigned as a deputy U.S. marshal for the Western District of Arkansas, which had responsibility also for Indian Territory. He served there until 1893. That year he transferred to the Eastern District of Texas in Paris, Texas, for a short while. In 1897, he was transferred again, serving at the Muskogee Federal Court in the Native Territory.

Reeves worked for 32 years as a federal peace officer in the Indian Territory and became one of Judge Parker's most valued deputies. Reeves brought in some of the most dangerous fugitives of the time. He was never wounded, despite having his hat and belt shot off on separate occasions.

In addition to being a marksman with a rifle and revolver, Reeves developed superior detective skills during his long career. When he retired in 1907, Reeves had on his record thousands of arrests of felons, some accounts claiming over 3,000. According to his obituary, he killed 14 outlaws to defend his life. Reeves even had to arrest his son for murder. Benjamin "Bennie" Reeves was charged with the murder of his wife. Despite the perpetrator being his son, Reeves insisted on the responsibility of bringing Bennie to justice. Accounts of the incident report that Bennie was captured by his father, or turned himself in. He was ultimately tried and convicted, serving 11 years at Fort Leavenworth in Kansas before his sentence was commuted. He reportedly lived the rest of his life as a model citizen.

When Oklahoma became a state in 1907, Reeves, then 68, became an officer of the Muskogee Police Department. He served for two years before he became ill and retired.

== Later years ==
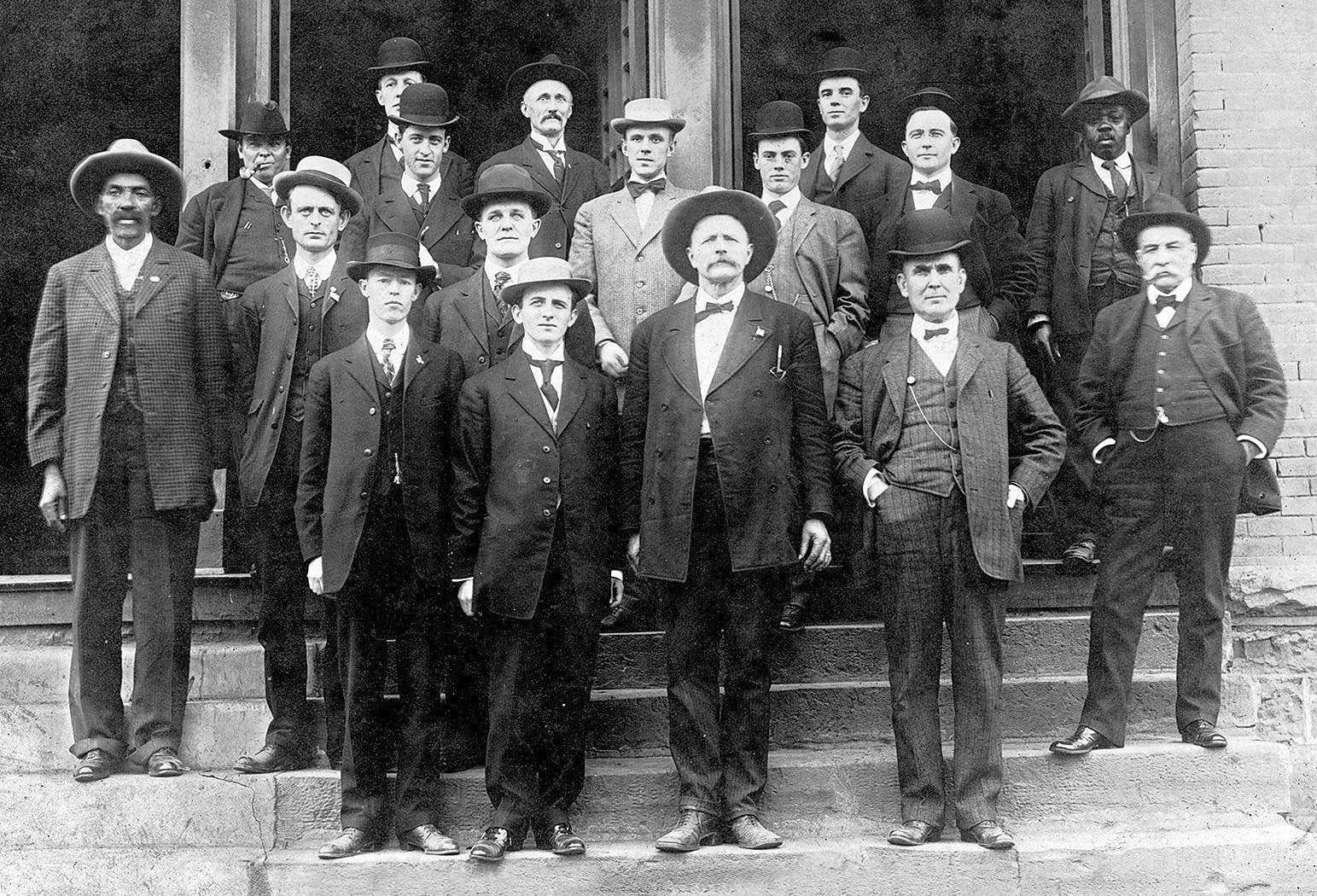
Reeves (left) with a group of Marshals and Federal employees at the Northern District of Indian Territory Federal Court in Muskogee in 1907

In 1886, Reeves was charged with murdering a posse cook. At his trial before Judge Parker, Reeves claimed to have shot William Leech by mistake while cleaning his gun. He was represented by former United States Attorney W. H. H. Clayton, who was a colleague and friend. Reeves was eventually acquitted, possibly based on his exceptional record.

== Personal life, and death ==
Reeves was married twice and had eleven children. In 1864, he married Nellie Jennie (d. 1896) and after her death, Winnie Sumter (1900–1910). His children were named Newland, Benjamin, George, Lula, Robert, Sally, Edgar, Bass Jr., Harriet, Homer and Alice.

Reeves's health began to fail further after retiring. He died of Bright's disease (nephritis) on January 12, 1910.

== Legacy ==
=== Family and descendants ===
He was a great-uncle of Paul L. Brady, who became the first Black man appointed as a federal administrative law judge in 1972.

His great-great-grandson is former National Football League and Canadian Football League player Willard Reaves. His great-great-great-grandsons are National Hockey League player Ryan Reaves and CFL player Jordan Reaves. (Ryan Reaves's grandfather is reported to have changed the family name from Reeves to Reaves, a claim not verified by historians or genealogists.)

=== Memorials ===
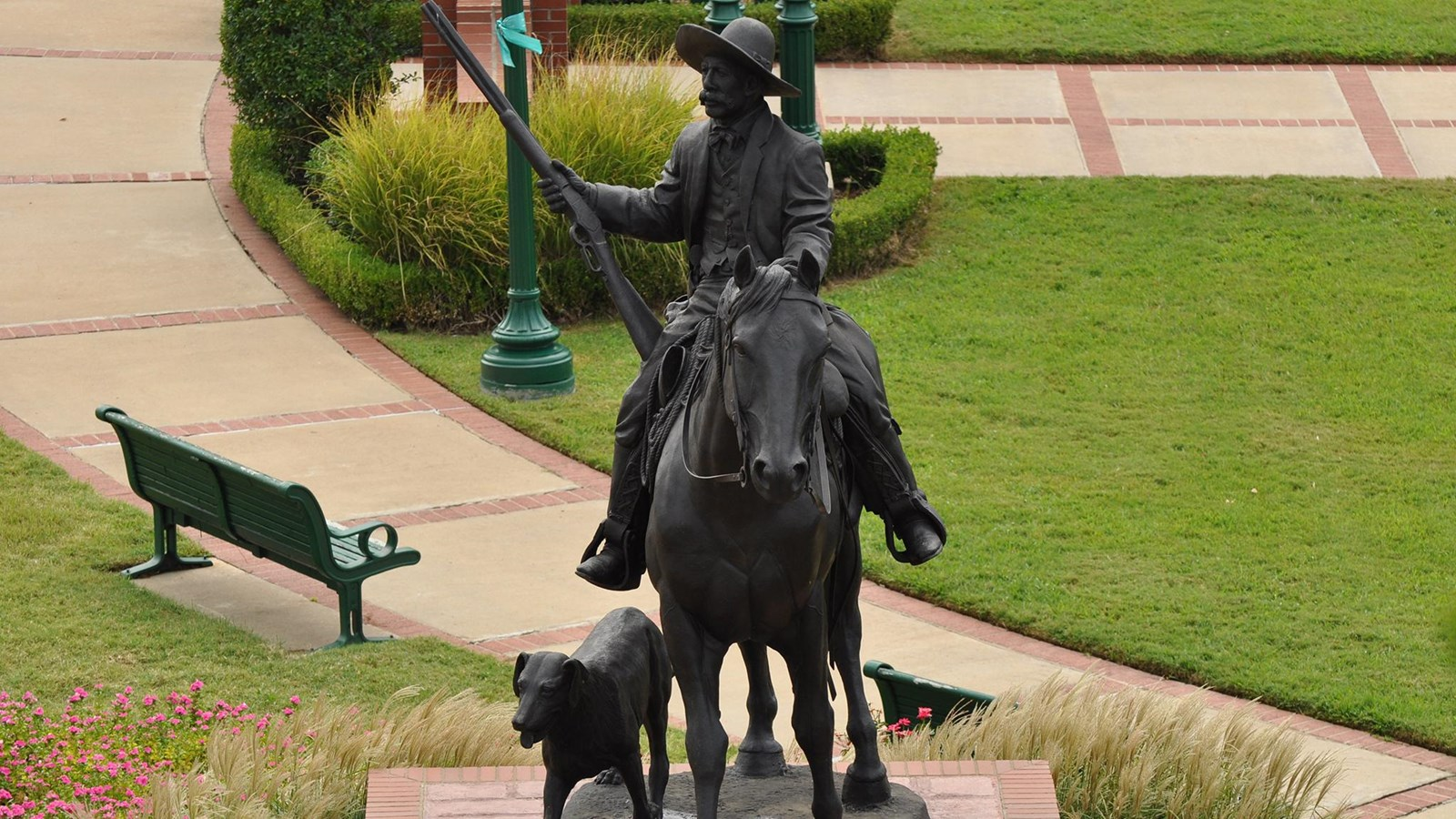
A statue dedicated to Bass Reeves in Fort Smith, Arkansas

- In 2011, the US-62 Bridge, which spans the Arkansas River between Muskogee and Fort Gibson, Oklahoma, was renamed the Bass Reeves Memorial Bridge.
- In May 2012, a bronze statue of Reeves by Oklahoma sculptor Harold Holden was erected in Pendergraft Park in Fort Smith, Arkansas.
- In 2013, he was inducted into the Texas Trail of Fame.
- He is also memorialized in a bronze statue on the stairway of the Lamar County Courthouse in Paris, Texas.

== Popular culture ==
=== Television ===
- Reeves is one possible inspiration for the Lone Ranger, the travelling hero of western radio, TV and films. According to historian Art T. Burton, "Bass Reeves is the closest person to resemble the Lone Ranger"; he cites many similarities, including Reeves working with Native American partners and handing out souvenir silver dollars.
- Reeves is the subject of season 1, episode 3 titled "Bass Reeves: Trailblazing Lawman" (2021) in the Roku series Wild West Chronicles.
- Reeves is the subject of season 2, episode 4 titled "The Real Lone Ranger" in Gunslingers.
- Reeves figures prominently in an episode of How It's Made, in which a Bass Reeves limited-edition collectors' figurine is shown in various stages of the production process.
- In "The Murder of Jesse James", an episode of the television series Timeless (season one, episode 12), Reeves is portrayed by Colman Domingo.
- Reeves was a featured subject of the Drunk History episode "Oklahoma" in which he was portrayed by Jaleel White.
- In "Everybody Knows", a season two episode of the television series Wynonna Earp, Reeves is portrayed by Adrian Holmes.
- Reeves is mentioned in the plot of "The Royal Family", a season two episode of the television series Greenleaf. Reeves's name is used as an alias by pastor Basie Skanks to support his church with gambling earnings.
- Reeves's status as one of the first black Deputy U.S. Marshals plays a significant role as a childhood role model for the character of Will Reeves in the Watchmen television series.
- Reeves is portrayed by Jamal Akakpo in three episodes featuring a fictional 1920s silent film based on Reeves's exploits titled "Trust in the Law".
- Reeves is mentioned in season 3, episode 2 of the television series Justified as two U.S. Marshals are discussing their all-time favorite historical U.S. Marshals.
- Reeves features in the "Stressed Western" episode of Legends of Tomorrow, portrayed by David Ramsey. Reeves is portrayed as Diggle's ancestor; Sara Lance calls him "Dig" at one point. The Legends encounter him at Fist City, Oklahoma while pursuing the Haverack, a rage-attracted alien worm that has been excreting gold. After the Haverack was slain by Astra Logue, Reeves brought Fist City back in order.
- Reeves features as a character played by Gary Beadle in the 2021 TV series Around the World in 80 Days.
- A miniseries based on Art T. Burton's 2006 biography (and co-produced by Morgan Freeman) was reported to be under development by HBO in 2015. The concept was later acquired by Amazon Studios in 2019 and ordered to series in 2022 under the title Twin Territories.
- In season 34, episode 14 of The Simpsons, "Carl Carlson Rides Again," the character Lenny states that the TV show "The Lone Ranger" is based on Reeves.
- A limited series based on the life of Reeves entitled Lawmen: Bass Reeves from creator Taylor Sheridan and starring David Oyelowo began airing on Paramount+ on November 5, 2023.
- His ghost appears in an episode of the second season of the animated series Gremlins: The Wild Batch voiced by Keith David.
- Reeves is the protagonist of Netflix's steampunk animated series Bass X Machina, voiced by Brian Tyree Henry.

=== Film ===
- In They Die by Dawn (2013), Reeves is portrayed by Harry Lennix.
- Hell on the Border is a 2019 action film based on the early law enforcement career of Reeves, starring David Gyasi. It was written and directed by Wes Miller and features Ron Perlman in a supporting role.
- In April 2018, Amazon Studios was reported to be developing a biopic of Reeves with the script and direction helmed by Chloé Zhao.
- Reeves is portrayed by Delroy Lindo in The Harder They Fall (2021).
- Reeves is portrayed by Isaiah Washington in the independent film Corsicana.

=== Theater ===
- A theatrical production about Reeves entitled Cowboy, written and directed by Layon Gray, debuted in 2019 at the National Black Theatre Festival. It played Off-Broadway at The Actors' Temple West 47th St in Manhattan.

=== Games ===
- Reeves is a character in the miniature wargame Wild West Exodus.
- Reeves is a playable character in the board game Western Legends.
- In the card game Cartaventura Oklahoma, one plays the fictional escape of Bass Reeves with five possible outcomes. The game also includes an insert with a summary of Bass Reeves's story.
- Bass Reeves appears as a quest NPC in the video game Nightingale.
- Reeves was to be the playable protagonist of Bass Reeves Can't Die, a game that was being developed by Strange Scaffold, the developers of El Paso, Elsewhere.

=== Comic books ===
- Darko Macan, Igor Kordey: Marshal Bass (12 books), Delcourt
- Reeves plays a supporting role in the Lucky Luke adventure "A Cowboy in High Cotton".
- Reeves was a supporting character alongside Doc Holliday in the miniseries Atomic Robo and the Knights of the Golden Circle (5 issues).

=== Hall of fame ===
- In 1992, he was inducted into the Hall of Great Westerners of the National Cowboy & Western Heritage Museum.
- In 2006, he was inducted into the National Multicultural Western Heritage Museum.
