= Layon Gray =

American playwright and director (born 1969)

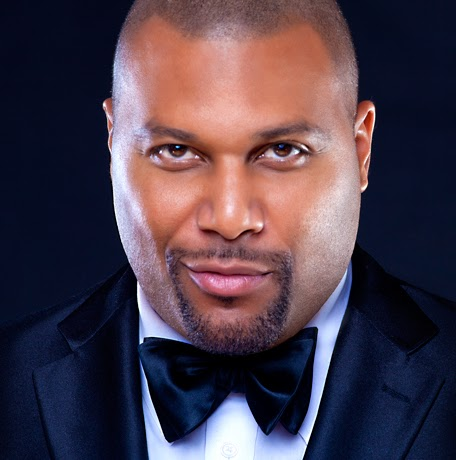
- Born: January 26, 1969 (age 57); Alexandria, Louisiana, U.S.
- Occupations: Playwright, film director
- Website: https://www.layongray.com/

Layon Gray (born January 26, 1969) is an American playwright and director. His best-known work is the off-Broadway play Black Angels Over Tuskegee, about the Tuskegee airmen.

== Career ==
A native of Louisiana, Gray writes, directs and develops stage plays and films. He focuses on creating conversational dialogue in his works, including traditional African-American theater. His play, Kings Of Harlem, depicts the New York Renaissance and was performed for the NBA Legends during All-Star week. This work has won several theater awards and is in development as a feature film. His work The Dahomey Warriors about the Dahomey Amazons depicts an all-female military regiment of the Kingdom of Dahomey, in the present-day Republic of Benin, which lasted until the end of the 19th century. This work was selected to perform at the 2017 National Black Theatre Festival and is in development as a television series. His play Cowboy about marshal Bass Reeves premiered in 2019 at the National Black Theatre Festival and returned for a performance in August 2022. His two man play about Redd Foxx and Richard Pryor entitled Foxx/Pryor was to begin performances in June, 2021.

Gray has also directed plays such as: A Raisin in the Sun, A Soldiers Play, The Crucible, Before It Hits Home, For Colored Girls Who Have Considered Suicide / When The Rainbow is Enuf, Miss Evers' Boys and De Moor.

== Works ==
Play	Year Premiered	Length	Notes
Meet Me At The Oak	2003	120 Minutes	Meet Me At The Oak premiered at Whitmore Lindley Theatre Center, in North Hollywood, CA in 2003 under the direction of Layon Gray. It would win Best Director, Best Play, Best Writer, Best Supporting Actor, Best Ensemble.
Diary Of A Catholic School Dropout	2005	80 Minutes	Diary Of A Catholic School Dropout premiered at the Avery Schreiber Theatre in North Hollywood. It was directed by Layon Gray. It would go on to win Best Play that year. It ran in Los Angeles for 5 Years.
WEBEIME	2006	90 Minutes	WEBEIME premiered at the Whitmore Lindley Theatre Center in North Hollywood in 2006. Additional performances were held at the Midtown International Theatre Festival in 2007, the National Black Theatre Festival in 2008, the Negro Ensemble Company in 2009, and Planet Connections Theatre Festivity in 2012. All performances under the direction of Layon Gray. The play would go on to win Best Director, Best Play, Best Ensemble, Best Production, Best Choreography.
Black Angels Over Tuskegee	2009 - open run	120 Minutes	Black Angels Over Tuskegee tells the story of the Tuskegee Airmen. The show premiered at the Whitmore Lindley Theatre Center in North Hollywood in 2009. Additional performances were held at the National Black Theatre Festival in 2009, St. Luke's Theatre in 2010, and The Actors' Temple in 2012. It has also been performed at the Smithsonian Institution, the NAACP, the National Urban League, The National WWII Museum, the United States Military Academy, the United States Army, the National Civil Rights Museum, Tuskegee University, and the Federal Reserve Bank of New York. The play would win an NAACP Award for Best Play. It is in pre-production for a Broadway transfer. '
The Girls Of Summer	2009	120 Minutes	The Girls Of Summer premiered off-Broadway at The Actors' Temple in 2010, under the direction of Layon Gray. It would go on to win an NAACP Award for Best Play.
Searching For Willie Lynch	2012	120 Minutes	Searching For Willie Lynch premiered at the National Black Theatre Festival in 2013. In 2015, it had a staged reading at the Signature Theatre Company in New York City produced by the Negro Ensemble Company. Under the direction of Layon Gray.
Kings Of Harlem	2015	90 Minutes	Kings Of Harlem premiered at the National Black Theatre Festival in 2015. Additional performances were held at The Actors' Temple In New York in 2016 and the M Ensemble in Miami in 2018. The play would go on to win Best Play, Best Director, Best Ensemble, and Best Supporting Actor. Under the direction of Layon Gray. The play is in development as a feature film.
CowBoy	2019	85 Minutes	National Black Theatre Festival debuted Cowboy, the story of Bass Reeves, in August 2019 under the direction of Layon Gray.
