= Kimberly Camp =

American artist and arts administrator (born 1956)

- Born: September 11, 1956 (age 69); Camden, New Jersey, U.S.
- Education: BA, University of Pittsburgh, 1978; MS in Arts Administration, Drexel University, 1986
- Known for: Painting, dollmaking, museum administration
- Occupations: Artist and museum leader
- Title: President of Galerie Marie (2013–present); Council on the Arts (1986–1989)
- Website: www.kimberlycamp.com www.galeriemarie.net

Kimberly Camp (September 11, 1956) is an artist and museum leader. She was the founding director of the Smithsonian Institution Experimental Gallery (1989–1993), president and CEO of the Charles H. Wright Museum of African American History (1994–1998) in Detroit, president and CEO of the Barnes Foundation (1998–2005) in Merion, Pennsylvania, and director of the Hanford Reach Interpretive Center, a project of the Richland Public Facilities District.

Her paintings and dolls have been featured in more than 100 exhibitions in the United States and internationally. Her dual career as an artist and museum leader administrator has earned her acclaim in both fields.

== Biography ==
=== Early life and education ===
Kimberly Camp was born on September 11, 1956, in Camden, New Jersey, the only child of Dr. Hubert Camp, an oral surgeon and jazz trumpeter, and Marie Dimery Camp. Surrounded with the arts during her childhood, her exposure to the arts was augmented by the world class museums in Philadelphia, Pennsylvania. Camp was enrolled in private painting lessons and participated in her first exhibition at the age of 12. She later studied painting with Austrian painter Alexandria Laimer and Friends School Mullica Hill as part of the school's first graduating class. Camp attended American University from 1973 to 1974, then transferred to University of Pittsburgh, where she earned her bachelor's degree in studio arts and art history.

Camp earned a Master of Science degree in arts administration from Drexel University in Philadelphia in 1986.

=== Early arts administration career ===
In 1983, Camp created a mural program called the Artistic Design Project, a first for the City of Camden. Camp participated in the creation of the Camden Annual Art Exhibition, at Rutgers University Camden Center for the Arts Stedman Gallery. She served on the board of the Walt Whitman Arts Center, and was an editor for the Philadelphia Chapter, National Conference of Artists, the oldest Black art organization in the United States. While attending Drexel University, Camp received a National Endowment Fellowship in Arts Management, in the Expansion Arts Program. From 1986 to 1989, she served as program director for arts education and minority arts services at the Pennsylvania Council for the Arts. Camp joined the Association of American Cultures (TAAC), the first national multicultural art organization in the US and served as vice chair of the board of directors.

=== Smithsonian Institution Experimental Gallery ===
In May 1989, Camp joined the Smithsonian Institution as director of the Experimental Gallery. The gallery presented eighteen exhibitions in the Arts and Industries Building from its opening in 1991 until 1995.

The Smithsonian Institution Experimental Gallery was an initiative of the Office of the Assistant Secretary for Museums. Conceived of by Elaine Heumann Gurian, the gallery served as a dynamic space for experimentation and innovation in exhibition design and presentation, context, interpretive strategies, physical and psychological access in the arts, humanities and sciences. Camp completed the vision of the gallery to have each exhibition signed by its creators, and used post-it notes to gather public comments within the gallery. Camp created the administrative framework for the gallery, which hosted the National Air and Space Museum's Principles of Flight exhibition, Finding Ones Way by the Exploratorium, "Etiquette of the Underclass" by Antenna Theater, and other exhibitions. The gallery also served as a model for diversifying Smithsonian museum attendance. The gallery closed in 1995.

=== Charles H. Wright Museum of African American History ===
In 1994, Camp became executive director then president and CEO of the Museum of African American History in Detroit, Michigan. Camp oversaw the expansion of the museum and construction of the new 125,000 square foot facility which opened to the public in 1997 as the largest Black museum in the world. She was instrumental in the design and planning for its inaugural exhibition "Of the People," which at the time was the largest exhibition ever mounted to tell the African-American story. Weeks before its opening, the museum's name changed to the Charles Wright Museum of African American History and Culture in recognition of its founder, Dr. Charles Wright.

=== Barnes Foundation ===
In 1998, Camp became the first museum professional to serve as president and CEO of the Barnes Foundation in Merion, Pennsylvania. The Barnes Foundation was created as a school in 1925 by Dr. Albert C. Barnes. It has the largest collections in the world of works by Renoir and Cézanne, and more Renoir, Cézanne and Matisse paintings and drawings than all the museums in Paris combined. With approximately 9000 works of art, the Barnes is the first purposefully multicultural collection of decorative, folk and fine art in the United States, including international artists Claude Monet, Tintoretto, Giorgione, Pablo Picasso, Vincent van Gogh, and American painters William Glackens, Horace Pippin, Charles and Maurice Prendergast.

Camps research into the Foundation's history was critical in winning court approval to relocate the foundation to Philadelphia Pennsylvania. Under her leadership, the Foundation's operations were professionalized to include conservation and a full inventory of the collections, cataloguing of the Foundation's archives, restoration of Kerfeal and the Merion arboretum, and restoration of the education programs. Camp lectures at colleges, universities and museums based on her research, to dispel entrenched beliefs and mythologies about the Foundation and its founder Barnes, a chemist and philanthropist who remained a staunch advocate for ending racial discrimination and social justice. Camp's manuscript titled Defending the Dead, includes a detailed account of the professionalization of the Foundation and its legal challenges during her tenure.

The Foundation was moved to Philadelphia's Benjamin Franklin Parkway in 2012. Controversy over the move began years before because of challenges from Lower Merion Township's zoning laws that restricted visitation. Camp's research became the basis for the legal petitions to relocate the Foundation to the Parkway, dispelling the widely held misinformation that Dr. Barnes' last will and testament was altered and that the Foundation's move was due to impending bankruptcy.

=== The Hanford Reach Interpretive Center ===
Camp moved to eastern Washington in 2007 to become the first executive director of the Hanford Reach Interpretive Center, a project of the Richland Public Facilities District. The center was created to tell the story of the Manhattan Project's Hanford nuclear site where the world's first atomic bomb was created and the story of the Hanford Reach National Monument. When the initial site was rejected by indigenous communities, Camp led the effort to construct the center on the banks of the Columbia River with their approval along with the US Army Corps of engineers, the US Federal Highways Administration, US Fish and Wildlife, state, and local agencies. After groundbreaking for the new facility in 2011, Camp announced her retirement.

=== Galerie Marie ===
Camp founded Galerie Marie in 2013, named for her late mother Marie Dimery Camp, in Collingswood, New Jersey. The gallery features Camp's paintings and dolls and the work of over 200 national and international artists and craftsmen. Camp's studios are also located on the property. Camp's papers, a collection of biographical material, writing, art, sketchbooks and recordings are being accessioned by the Smithsonian Institution Archives of American Art.

=== Teaching and consulting ===
From 2019 to 2021, Camp served as a co-curator for A New View Camden public art project of the City of Camden with support from Bloomberg Philanthropies. Camp teaches art history, art administration and museum leadership at several regional colleges and universities including Rutgers Camden and Drexel University. From 2015 to 2016, she served as senior lecturer at Lincoln University where she created its first undergraduate museum major program. Camp is a regular consultant for non-profit organizations on strategic planning, leadership transition and best practices in governance.

Camp was part time lecturer at Rutgers University Camden Campus from 2020 until 2022. Previously, Camp taught at Lincoln University, Camden County College and Drexel University. Camp consults for non-profit organizations on strategic planning, leadership transition and best practices in governance. She has consulted the Barnes Foundation as Senior Advisor to the Board of Trustees, and was consultant to the Andrew Mellon Collection Assessment, the Pennsylvania Council on the Arts Strategies for Success program, the Freelon Group/ Wachovia Bank for the Harvey Gannt Center, Friends School Mullica Hill, Aljira: A Center for Contemporary Art, Vines Architecture for the North Carolina Civil War History Center, and Cooper's Ferry Partnership/Rutgers Camden Center for the Arts: A New View.

== Style and works ==
=== Thematic and artistic development ===
Camp's paintings and dolls reflect her life experiences, family stories, mythologies, and fantasy. She began as an oil painter, then began working almost exclusively in acrylic paint. Camp's dolls extend beyond the African-American experience to include a wide range of interests, cultural knowledge and travel.

=== Dolls ===
Camp has described her dollmaking process as intuitive, and "[growing] off her work table." She was inspired to begin creating dolls to allow African Americans, particularly children, to engage with their history and culture through play.

Camp draws on her own spirituality, with imagery from mysticism and the occult, and world religions. Curator Philip Collins described her dolls as being "possessed with a visual excitement that expresses an aura of mystery and rare beauty."

In 1982, Camp began making Brown Babies using hand-dyed cotton and African textiles, to represent western, central and eastern African ethnic groups. Painter Faith Ringgold saw Camp's dolls in an exhibition for the Women's Caucus for the Arts of the College Art Association. Ringgold purchased five dolls and later connected Camp with an editor at Essence magazine who picked up the story. After being featured in Essence, Camp began selling the dolls internationally. She later changed the name to Kimkins, which have been published in local print and broadcast media, National Geographic World, Essence and Ebony magazines.

==== One-of-a-kind dolls ====
In 1989, Camp began making one-of-a-kind dolls. Camp uses materials from world cultures to craft dolls with layered significance. Her materials include raffia, animal teeth and antler, textiles, beads and cowrie shells. Her dolls have appeared in The New York Times, FiberArts, The Village Voice and Smithsonian.

Camp's "Twilight" doll garnered artistic and critical attention when it was the centerpiece and catalogue cover illustration for the 1995 traveling exhibition "Uncommon Beauty and Common Objects," organized by the National Afro-American Museum and Cultural Center in Wilberforce, Ohio.

=== Paintings ===
Camp's early works were primarily animal portraits. Her colorful realistic paintings have been shown in over 100 exhibitions in the United States and abroad. Subjects include family members, and images created to reflect Camp's deep spiritual experiences. She was featured in a one-person exhibition at the Prizm Art Fair by Filo Sofi Arts, during 2022 Art Basel Miami.

== Awards and fellowships ==
Camp has received numerous awards and fellowships over the course of her career. She received the Kellogg National Leadership Program Fellowship two National Endowment for the Arts fellowships, and a Smithsonian International Travel fellowship as Visiting Scholar for Tokyo Gedia University. She was also named one of the Outstanding Young Women of America.

Year	Award	Association
2021	Gold Award Best of Show	Peters Valley School of Craft
2020	Award of Excellence	American Craft Council
2020	Lillian Levy Standing Ovation Award	South Jersey Cultural Alliance
1999	Roger L. Stevens Award for Contributions to the Arts and Culture	Carnegie Mellon University
1994	Award of Distinction	Kentucky Art and Craft Foundation
1994	Spirit of Detroit	Detroit City Council
1988	Purchase Award	J. B. Speed Art Museum
1986	New Jersey State Senate Citation	New Jersey State Senate
1986	Builders of the Community Award	Camden County Cultural and Heritage Commission
1986	Achievement in Painting	Chicago Museum of Science and Industry
1985	Achievement in Painting	Chicago Museum of Science and Industry
1985	Community Service Award	Association of Negro Business and Professional Women
1984	Arts Achievement Award	City of Camden
1984	National Service Award	National Conference of Artists

== Exhibitions ==
Her paintings and dolls have appeared in over a hundred solo and group exhibitions.

=== Selected exhibitions ===
==== Solo exhibitions ====
- 2021–2022: "Spirit Guides," Filo Sofi Arts, Cranford, NJ
- 2022: Solo exhibition, Filo Sofi Arts at Prizm Art Fair, Miami
- 2018: “The Links: Kimberly Camp,” Noyes Museum, Stockton University
- 2014–2015: Solo exhibition, Zora Neale Hurston Museum
- 2007–2008: Stories: Paintings and Dolls by Kimberly Camp, African American Museum in Philadelphia
- 2006: African American Dolls by Kimberly Camp, Black Academy of Arts and Letters, Dallas, TX
- 1996: Solo Exhibition, University of Michigan, Ann Arbor MI
- 1994: Solo Exhibition, CRT/Craftery Gallery, Hartford, CT
- 1994: Solo Exhibition, Harrison Museum of African American Culture, Roanoke, VA
- 1994: Solo Exhibition for the Emerging Forms Series, International Sculpture Center, Washington, DC
- 1993: Fabric Figures, Taubman Museum of Art, Roanoke, VA

==== Group exhibitions ====
- 2021: Shrine to Beauty. Filo Sofi Arts, Cranford, NJ
- 2012: Freedom to See Ourselves, Washington State University
- 2009: Women Who Walk the Path, Washington State University
- 2007: From Taboo to Icon: Africanist Turnabout, Tyler School of Art and Architecture, Icebox Gallery
- 1995–1996: International Women's Art, World Bank Art Society
- 1993–1995: Uncommon Beauty in Common Objects: The Legacy of African American Craft Art, National Afro-American Museum and Cultural Center
- 1993–1995: Traveling exhibition, American Craft Museum; African American Panoramic Experience; Museum of Afro-American Life and Culture; Afro- American Fine Art Museum; Renwick Gallery of American Crafts, National Museum of American Art
- 1993–1995: Traveling exhibition, American Museums of Quilts and Textiles; National Afro-American Museum; Junior Black Academy of Arts and Letters Quiltworks '93; Frank Hale Cultural Center
- 1993–1994: Touch: Beyond the Visual, National Museum of Women in the Arts; The Hand Workshop
- 1992: Dolls! by African-American Artists, Diggs Gallery, Winston-Salem State University
- 1991: Yes Sir. That's My Baby. African American Dolls. Banneker-Douglass Museum,

=== Public collections ===
- J.B. Speed Art Museum
- Camden Historical Society
- Reader's Digest
- Manchester Craftsmen's Guild

=== Private collections ===
- Faith Ringgold
- Judith Jamison
- Delroy and Nashormeh Lindo
- Abbey Lincoln
- Juliette Bethea
- Anne Wollman
- Cynthia Reese
- Anne d'Harnoncourt
- Joseph Rishel

=== Workshops and residencies ===
- Baltimore Museum of Art
- Afro-American Historical and Cultural Society Museum
- Virginia Museum of Fine Arts
- Longwood Gardens, Kennett Square
- Anacostia Community Museum and Renwick Gallery - Smithsonian Institution
- Harrison Museum of African American Culture
- African American Museum in Philadelphia
- Indiana University of Pennsylvania
- Virginia Museum of Fine Arts
- Banneker-Douglass Museum, Annapolis

== External media ==
- Artist Talk: Kimberly Clark - video from Philadelphia Museum of Art
- The Doll Maker of Collingswood: Kimberly Camp - video on THIRTEEN
- Artist Kimberly Camp on Defining the Muse in Creativity, Education and Beyond - audio interview
- Meet the Artist - Kimberly Camp
- Kimberly Camp - John Anderson Lecture Series Penn State University
