= North Carolina Black Repertory Company =

First Black theatre organization in North Carolina

Coordinates: 36.0987°N 80.2488°W

The North Carolina Black Repertory Company was founded in Winston-Salem, North Carolina in 1979 by Larry Leon Hamlin. It was the first organization for black theatre in the state. On their website they highlight how they are "Committed to exposing diverse audiences to Black theatre classics, the development and production of new works, and sustaining Black theatre internationally."

In addition to producing several productions throughout the year, its most notable program is the National Black Theatre Festival.
