= Curtis King =

Curtis King may refer to:

- Curtis King (baseball) (born 1970), former pitcher in Major League Baseball
- Curtis King (politician), American politician in the Washington State Senate
- Curtis King (director), American musical theatre director
- Curtis King Jr., singer on The Raccoons, a Canadian animated television series
- Curtiss King, American rapper and record producer

== See also ==
- King Curtis, American saxophonist
