= Coldwater, Mississippi =

- Town
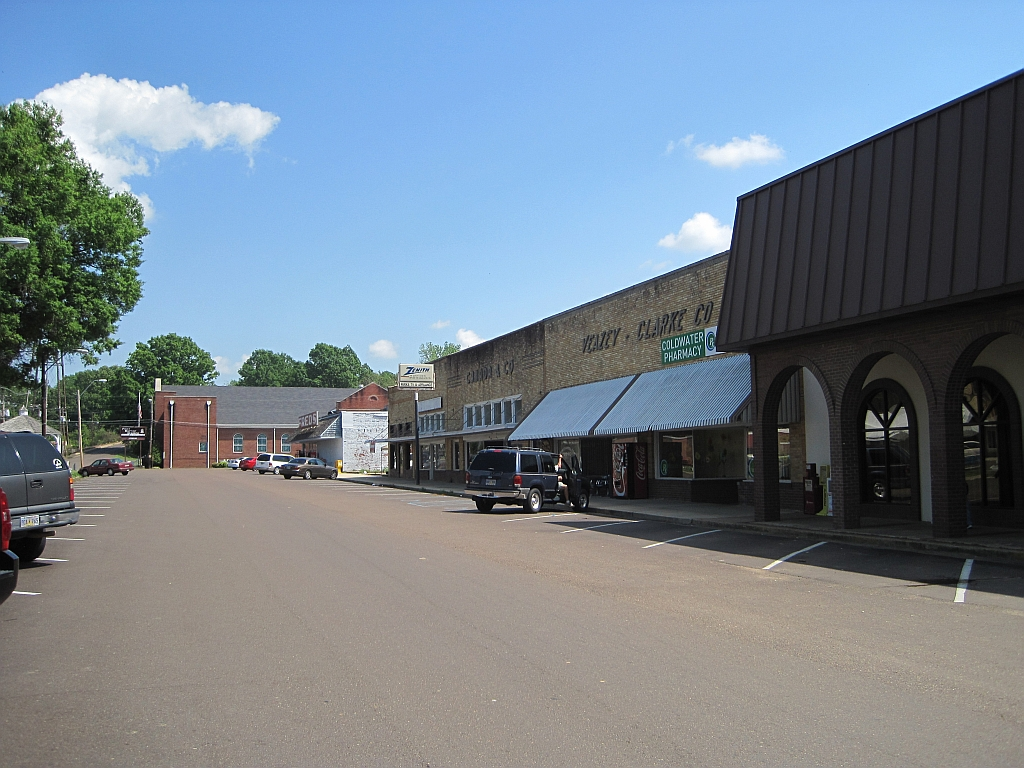
- Central Avenue

- Flag
- Nickname: C-Town
- Location of Coldwater, Mississippi

- Location in the United States
- Coordinates: 34°41′25″N 89°58′33″W
- Country: United States
- State: Mississippi
- County: Tate

Area
  - Total: 2.38 sq mi (6.16 km^{2})
  - Land: 2.37 sq mi (6.15 km^{2})
  - Water: 0.0039 sq mi (0.01 km^{2})
- Elevation: 262 ft (80 m)

Population (2020)
  - Total: 1,381
  - Density: 581.6/sq mi (224.55/km^{2})
- Time zone: UTC-6 (Central (CST))
  - Summer (DST): UTC-5 (CDT)
- ZIP code: 38618
- Area code: 662
- FIPS code: 28-14900
- GNIS feature ID: 2406292
- Website: coldwaterms.org

Coldwater is a town in Tate County, Mississippi, United States, and is part of the Memphis Metropolitan Area. As of the 2020 census, Coldwater had a population of 1,381.

== History ==
The town square of Coldwater is approximately two miles south of the Coldwater River, hence the name. The original town began in 1856, called the village of Elm Grove. Construction of the Mississippi and Tennessee Railroad through here in 1856 stimulated development. Rows of stores and other businesses developed on both sides of the tracks, along with houses of worship. Because the Depot was named Coldwater, the town eventually changed its name from Elm Grove to Coldwater. Coldwater was officially incorporated in 1872. At that time, the Town was located in DeSoto County and was a mile square, with the railroad depot at the center. The area was developed for cotton plantations and Coldwater became a trading center.

In 1873 during Reconstruction, the legislature organized Tate County from portions of DeSoto, Marshall and Tunica counties. Coldwater fell into the new county. The Town began to grow with an influx of settlers from Virginia, the Carolinas, Alabama, and other areas seeking a better life for themselves and their families. There were 397 residents of Coldwater according to the 1890 census. By 1884, there were 96 small schools in Tate County: 54 white and 42 black. They were mostly one teacher, one-room log houses with split logs for seats.

Coldwater steadily grew in numbers. However, periodic river flooding plagued the town, although it was also the basis of the farmland's fertility. The Army Corps of Engineers built the Arkabutla Lake and Dam project along the Coldwater River in the early 1940s. Town residents believed they needed to move and the Town was relocated and reconstructed on land about a mile and a half south of its original location.

The site of the old town of Coldwater is 229 feet (70 m) MSL. Parts of it are underwater year round.

Radio station WREC was founded in Coldwater by Hoyt B. Wooten. It broadcast news talk information. The station is now called WREG-TV and broadcasts news on a major news network.

== Geography ==
According to the United States Census Bureau, the town has a total area of 2.4 square miles (6.2 km^{2}), of which 2.4 square miles (6.1 km^{2}) is land and 0.42% water.

== Demographics ==
Historical population
Census	Pop.	Note	%±
1880	397		—
1890	518		30.5%
1900	557		7.5%
1910	774		39.0%
1920	856		10.6%
1930	664		−22.4%
1940	690		3.9%
1950	949		37.5%
1960	1,264		33.2%
1970	1,450		14.7%
1980	1,505		3.8%
1990	1,502		−0.2%
2000	1,674		11.5%
2010	1,677		0.2%
2020	1,381		−17.7%
U.S. Decennial Census

=== Racial and ethnic composition ===
Coldwater town, Mississippi – Racial and ethnic composition Note: the US Census treats Hispanic/Latino as an ethnic category. This table excludes Latinos from the racial categories and assigns them to a separate category. Hispanics/Latinos may be of any race.
Race / Ethnicity (NH = Non-Hispanic)	Pop 2000	Pop 2010	Pop 2020	% 2000	% 2010	% 2020
White alone (NH)	492	369	273	29.39%	22.00%	19.77%
Black or African American alone (NH)	1,166	1,260	1,032	69.65%	75.13%	74.73%
Native American or Alaska Native alone (NH)	1	7	1	0.06%	0.42%	0.07%
Asian alone (NH)	2	3	2	0.12%	0.18%	0.14%
Native Hawaiian or Pacific Islander alone (NH)	0	0	0	0.00%	0.00%	0.00%
Other race alone (NH)	0	4	3	0.00%	0.24%	0.22%
Mixed race or Multiracial (NH)	6	10	50	0.36%	0.60%	3.62%
Hispanic or Latino (any race)	7	24	20	0.42%	1.43%	1.45%
Total	1,674	1,677	1,381	100.00%	100.00%	100.00%

=== 2000 census ===
As of the census of 2000, there were 1,674 people, 598 households, and 429 families residing in the town. The population density was 705.5 inhabitants per square mile (272.4/km^{2}). There were 642 housing units at an average density of 270.6 per square mile (104.5/km^{2}). The racial makeup of the town was 69.71% African American, 29.45% White, 0.06% Native American, 0.12% Asian, and 0.66% from two or more races. Hispanic or Latino of any race were 0.42% of the population.

There were 598 households, out of which 36.6% had children under the age of 18 living with them, 39.1% were married couples living together, 28.6% had a female householder with no husband present, and 28.1% were non-families. 25.1% of all households were made up of individuals, and 10.4% had someone living alone who was 65 years of age or older. The average household size was 2.80 and the average family size was 3.35.

In the town, the population was spread out, with 31.5% under the age of 18, 8.0% from 18 to 24, 29.0% from 25 to 44, 20.3% from 45 to 64, and 11.2% who were 65 years of age or older. The median age was 32 years. For every 100 females, there were 79.8 males. For every 100 females age 18 and over, there were 72.6 males.

The median income for a household in the town was $26,058, and the median income for a family was $31,364. Males had a median income of $28,472 versus $19,444 for females. The per capita income for the town was $12,330. About 21.1% of families and 23.5% of the population were below the poverty line, including 26.9% of those under age 18 and 26.7% of those age 65 or over.

== Education ==
The Town of Coldwater is served by the Tate County School District. It has two schools, Coldwater Elementary and Coldwater High School. Coldwater High School has gone to the state championship in track and basketball numerous times. The girls' basketball team won state championships in 1996, 2007, and 2008 while also making it to the final two since 2003. The boys' basketball team won in 2009 and 2012 and has also made appearances since 2003. The school mascot is known as the Mighty Coldwater Cougar, and the school colors are blue, gold, and white.

== Notable people ==
- Felicia C. Adams, U.S. Attorney for the United States District Court for the Northern District of Mississippi
- Dorris Bowdon, actress
- Don Castle, baseball player
- Bill Coday, blues singer
- Kamala (1950-2020), The Ugandan Giant, WWE wrestler
- Trell Kimmons, Olympic track and field runner
- Curtis King, founder of The Black Academy of Arts and Letters
- Cameron Lawrence, NFL
- Dumas Malone, Pulitzer Prize-winning historian
- Austin Riley, Atlanta Braves third baseman
- Big Time Sarah, blues singer
- T. Webber Wilson, three-term U.S. Representative from Mississippi from 1923-1929
- Mitch Young, gridiron football player

== Gallery ==
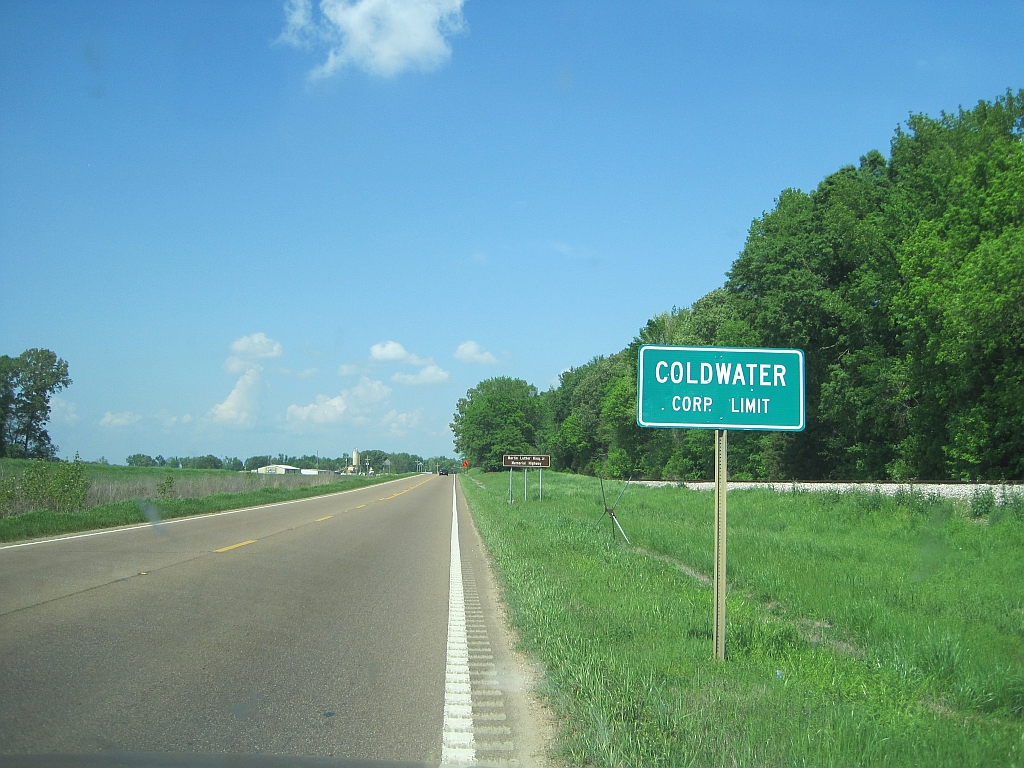
Highway sign

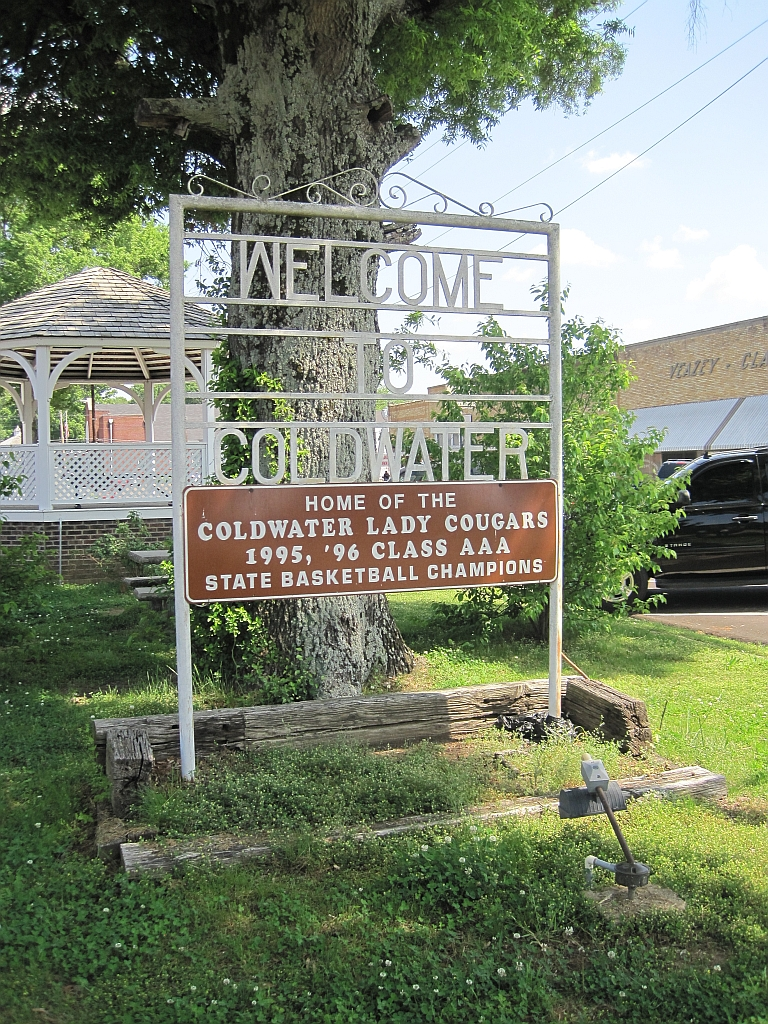
Welcome sign

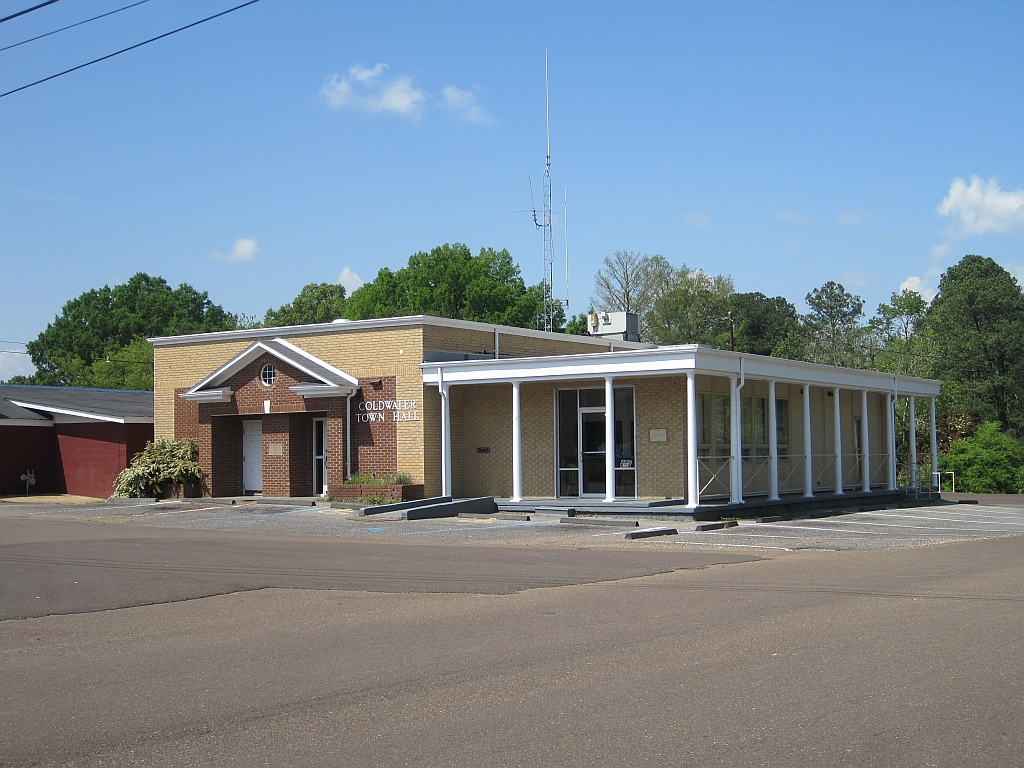
Town Hall

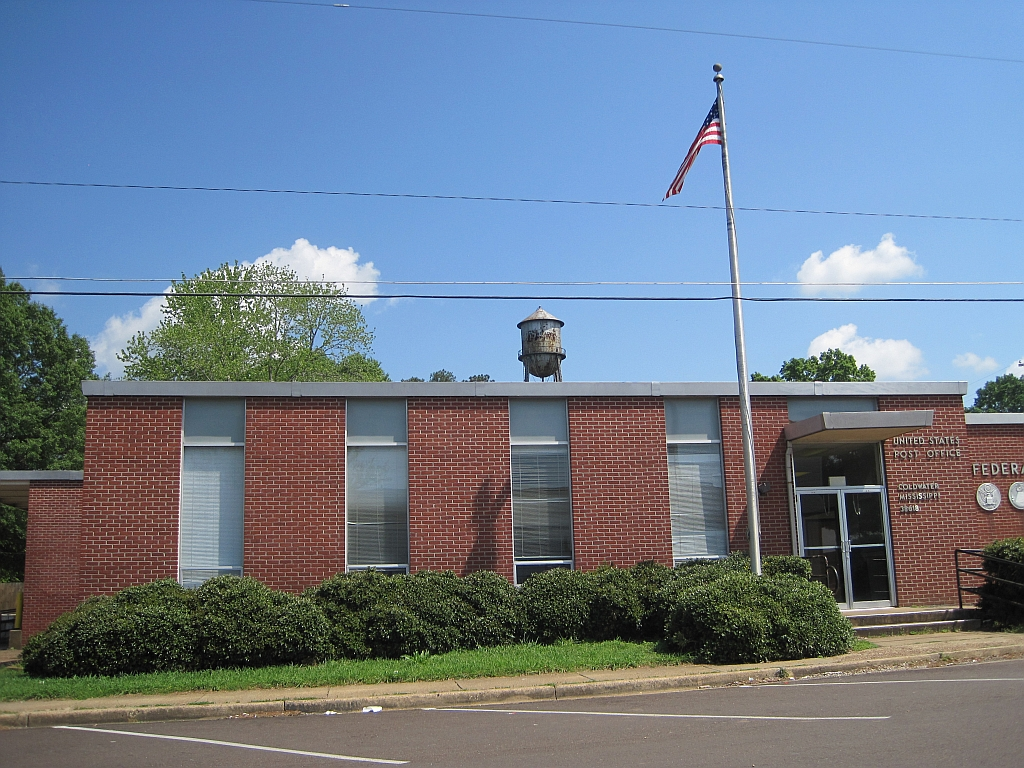
US Post Office

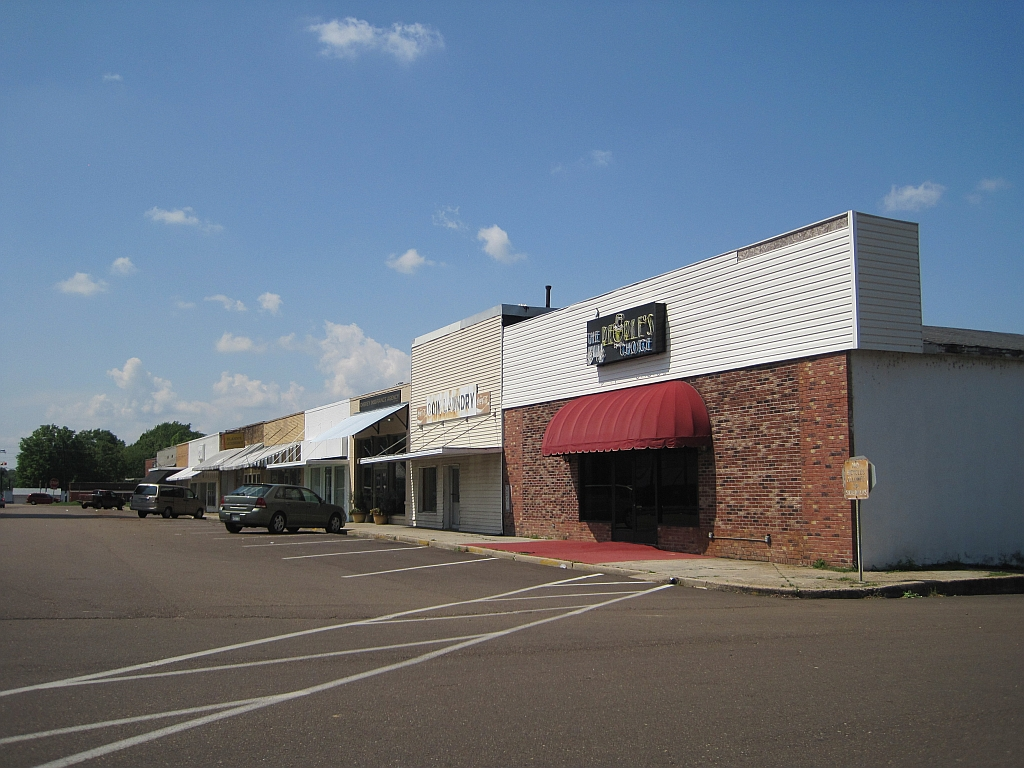
Central Avenue

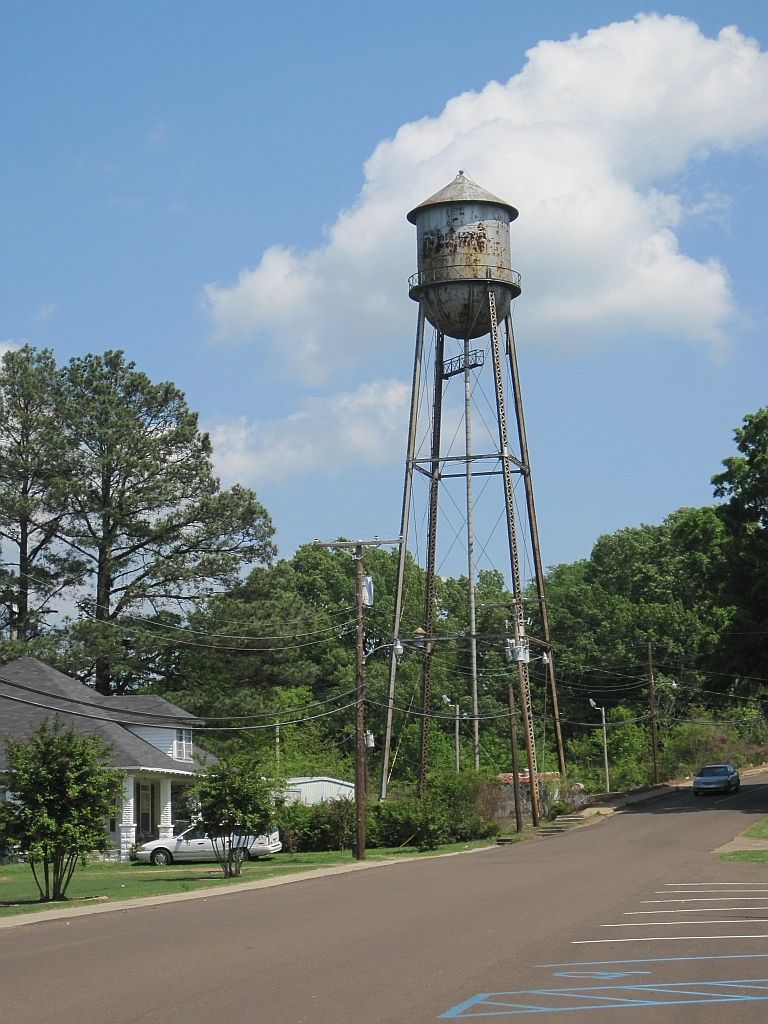
Water tower
