= Curtis King (director) =

Founder of The Black Academy of Arts and Letters

Curtis King (born 1951) is the founder, chief executive and president of The Black Academy of Arts and Letters (TBAAL), an arts organization founded in Dallas, Texas. King has written and directed live productions for audiences in Dallas and throughout the United States.

== Early life and education ==
King was born on December 20, 1951, in Coldwater, Mississippi. He graduated from Tate County High School, a segregated high school, in 1969, and attended Jackson State University, where he was mentored by poet and writer Margaret Walker. King earned his master's degree in theater from Texas Christian University in 1974, and worked for the Mayor's Council on Youth Opportunity in Fort Worth and the Sojourner Truth Theater Company prior to founding TBAAL.

== Career ==
King founded the Junior Black Academy of Arts and Letters in 1977 with $250. He recruited performers and supporters, and the organization initially operated in his apartment in Dallas. It became The Black Academy of Arts and Letters (TBAAL) in 1997. TBAAL is now housed at the Kay Bailey Hutchison Convention Center and hosts over one hundred performances per year.

King wrote and directed "I Remember...", the 1993 Kennedy Center gala celebration commemorating the 30th anniversary of the March on Washington. King wrote, directed, and produced many of TBAAL's most well known series including Symphony with the Divas, The Christmas/Kwanza Celebration, The Juneteenth Jam, and the Emmy award winning Black Music and the Civil Rights Movement Concert.

King received the Larry Leon Hamlin Producer's Award from the National Black Theatre Festival in 2001. In 2017, he founded the Riverfront Jazz Festival in Dallas, and is the producer of this annual event.
