= Columbia River Exhibition of History, Science, and Technology =

Museum in Washington, United States

Coordinates: 46°16′25.43″N 119°16′20.78″W

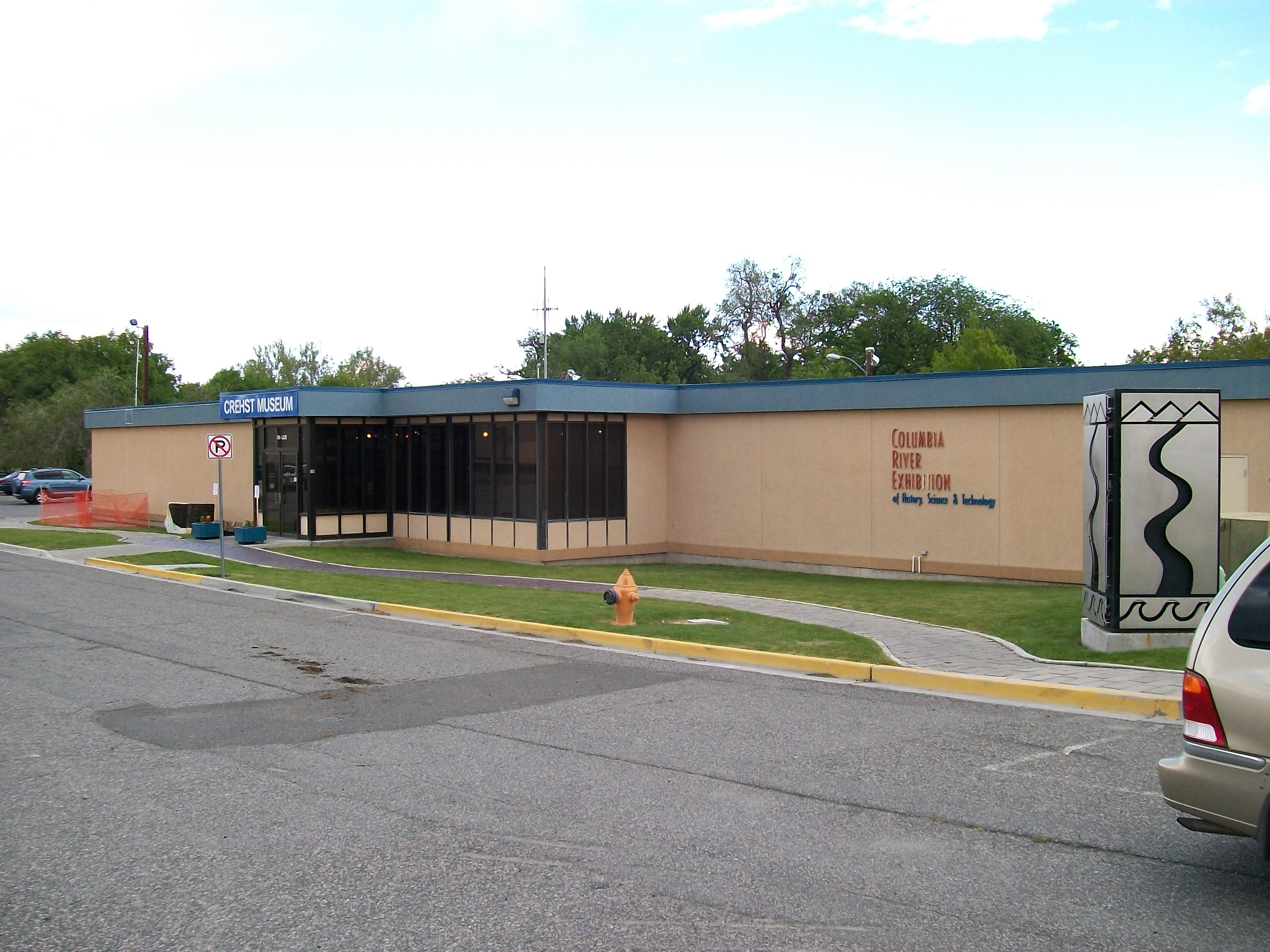

The Columbia River Exhibition of History, Science, and Technology (CREHST) was a non-profit museum and science center located in Richland, Washington, dedicated to telling the story of the Columbia Basin and surrounding region. Permanent exhibits include displays about the history of the Hanford Site and Richland, the geology of the Pacific Northwest, and others. The museum was founded in 1995 following the closing of the Hanford Science center, and it closed on January 31, 2014. The museum transitioned into the Hanford Reach Interpretive Center which opened in July 2014. Many of the exhibits from the CREHST were moved over to the Hanford Reach Interpretive Center.
