= Richland, Washington =

City in Washington, United States

- City
- City of Richland
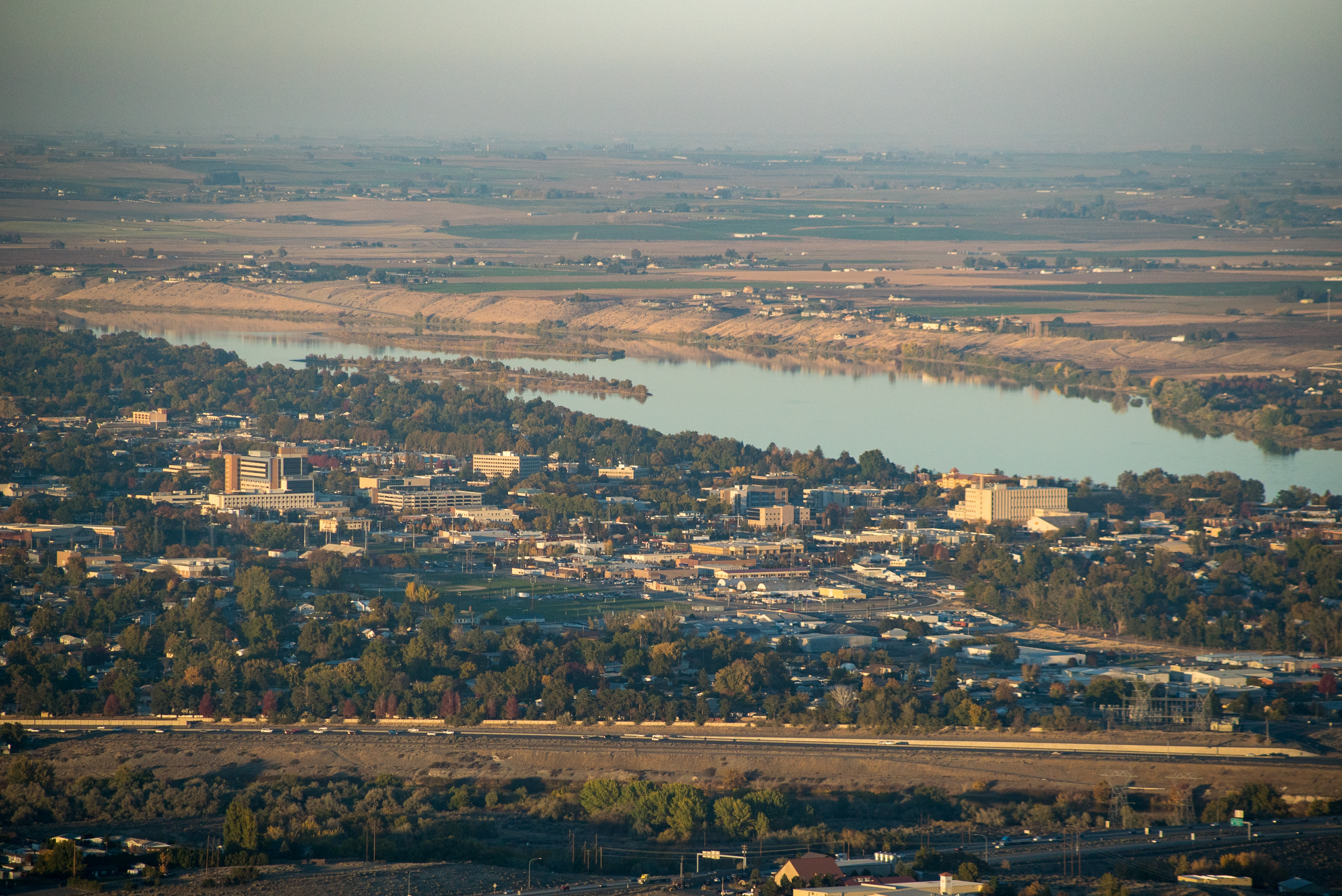
- View over downtown Richland in October 2018

- Flag
- Nicknames: The Windy City, City Of the Bombers, Atomic City
- Interactive location map of Richland
- Coordinates: 46°16′49″N 119°16′31″W
- Country: United States
- State: Washington
- County: Benton
- Incorporated: April 28, 1910
- Re-incorporated: December 10, 1958

Government
  - Type: Council–manager government
  - Mayor: Theresa Richardson

Area
  - City: 42.62 sq mi (110.38 km^{2})
  - Land: 39.22 sq mi (101.59 km^{2})
  - Water: 3.39 sq mi (8.79 km^{2})
- Elevation: 404 ft (123 m)

Population (2020)
  - City: 60,560
  - Estimate (2023): 63,757
  - Rank: US: 667th WA: 22nd
  - Density: 1,345.5/sq mi (519.5/km^{2})
  - Urban: 232,954 (US: 171st)
  - Metro: 303,501 (US: 164th)
  - CSA: 357,146 (US: 103rd)
  - Tri-Cities: 215,024
- Time zone: UTC−8 (Pacific (PST))
  - Summer (DST): UTC−7 (PDT)
- ZIP codes: 99352, 99353,99354
- Area code: 509
- FIPS code: 53-58235
- GNIS feature ID: 2410937
- Website: richlandwa.gov

Richland (/ˈrɪtʃlənd/) is a city in Benton County, Washington, United States. It is located in southeastern Washington at the confluence of the Yakima and the Columbia Rivers. As of the 2020 census, the city's population was 60,560. Along with the nearby cities of Pasco and Kennewick, Richland forms the Tri-Cities metropolitan area.

The townsite was established in 1905 and incorporated as Richland in 1910. The U.S. Army acquired the city and surrounding areas in 1943 for the establishment of the Hanford nuclear site, part of the Manhattan Project during World War II. Richland was transformed into a bedroom community for Hanford workers and grew to 25,000 residents by the end of the war. The city remained under control of Hanford contractors until it was re-incorporated as a city in 1958.

== History ==
For centuries, the village of Chemna was at the mouth of the Yakima River. Today the village site is called Columbia Point. From the village, the indigenous Wanapum, Yakama, and Walla Walla people harvested salmon runs entering the Yakima River. Captain William Clark of the Lewis and Clark Expedition visited the mouth of the Yakima River on October 17, 1805.

=== Formative years ===
In 1904–1905, W.R. Amon and his son Howard purchased 2,300 acres (9.3 km^{2}) and proposed a town site on the north bank of the Yakima River. Postal authorities approved the designation of this town site as Richland in 1905, naming it for Nelson Rich, a state legislator and land developer. In 1906, the town was registered at the Benton County Courthouse. It was incorporated on April 28, 1910, as a fourth-class city.

Population growth in Richland accelerated following the opening of a permanent bridge over the Yakima River in 1907 and a highway to Kennewick in 1926. A cable ferry to Pasco operated across the Columbia River from 1894 to 1931, when it was replaced by a modern bridge.

=== World War II ===
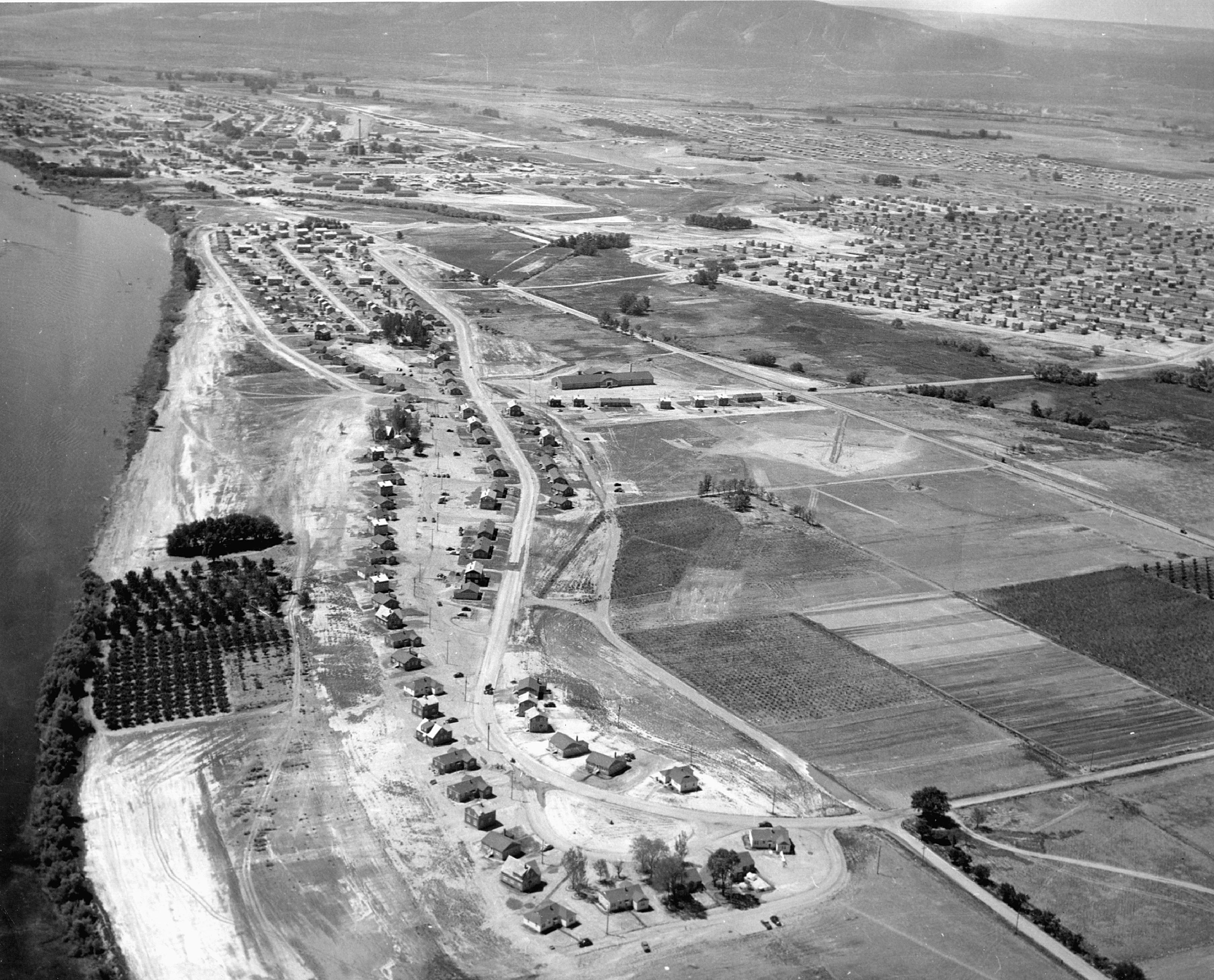
Richland during the early days of the Hanford project

Richland was a small farm town until the U.S. Army purchased 640 sq mi (1,660 km^{2}) of land – over half the size of Rhode Island – along the Columbia River during World War II for the Manhattan Project. On March 6, 1943, over 300 residents of Richland as well as those of the now vanished towns of White Bluffs and Hanford just upriver were evicted after a federal court order had condemned their properties for wartime use.

The army transformed Richland into a bedroom community for the workers on its Manhattan Project facility at the nearby Hanford Engineering Works (now the Hanford site). The population increased from 300 in July and August 1943 to 25,000 by the end of World War II in August 1945. All land and buildings were owned by the government. Housing was assigned to residents, and token rent was collected; families were assigned to houses or duplexes; single people were placed in apartments or barracks. Everything necessary was provided, from free bus service to light bulbs, and trees were planted in people's yards by the government. Much of the city was planned by Spokane architect Gustav Albin Pehrson and overseen by the Army Corps of Engineers. While dormitories and barracks were being built at the time, prefabricated duplexes and single-family homes are all that survive today. Because homes were allocated based on family size and need, there were a number of floorplans available. These were each identified by a letter of the alphabet, and so came to be known as alphabet houses.

Richland's link to the Army Engineers is suggested by its street nomenclature; many of the streets are named after famous engineers. The main street (George Washington Way) is named after the first president, who was a surveyor; Stevens Drive is named after John Frank Stevens, chief engineer of the Panama Canal and Stevens Pass; Goethals Drive is named after George W. Goethals, designer of the Panama Canal; and Thayer Drive is named after Sylvanus Thayer, superintendent of West Point and later founder of the Thayer School of Engineering at Dartmouth College. The rule is that if alphabet houses reside on a given street, they are named after an engineer or a type of tree.

=== Cold War era ===
With the end of the war, the Hanford workers' camp, originally located 15 miles (24 km) north of Richland at the old Hanford town site, was closed down. Although many of the workers moved away as the war effort wound down, some of them moved to Richland, offsetting the depopulation that might otherwise have occurred. Management of the Hanford site and Richland itself was transferred to General Electric.

Fears that the Soviet Union's intentions were aggressive set off the Cold War in 1947. The capacity to produce plutonium was increased beginning in 1947. When the Soviet Union developed and tested its first nuclear weapon in 1949, the U.S. nuclear program was reinvigorated. A second post-WWII expansion began in 1950 due to the war in Korea. Richland's Cold War construction boom resulted in Richland's population growing to 27,000 people by 1952. Many of these people lived in a construction camp of trailers located in what is now north Richland. With time, these trailers were vacated and the core city grew. Others lived at Camp Columbia near Horn Rapids until the camp was closed in 1950. In 2005 several dozen houses built in the northern part of the core city during this boom were added to the National Register of Historic Places as the Gold Coast Historic District.

=== Transition to private property ===
In 1954, Harold Orlando Monson was elected the first mayor of Richland and traveled to Washington, D.C., to negotiate increased rights (such as private home ownership) for citizens in military cities across the country. The U.S. Congress passed a law the following year to mandate the transfer of Richland and Oak Ridge to local control within five years, spurring a new incorporation attempt. The federal government relinquished its land holdings in 1957 and sold the city's real estate to residents; the last home was sold on May 16, 1960. Most of the people lived in duplexes; senior tenants were given the option to purchase the building; junior tenants were given the option to purchase lots in a newly platted area of north Richland.

Richland was re-incorporated as a chartered first-class city on December 10, 1958, five months after residents voted in favor of self-governance as a city. Among the first additions to the new city was an expanded public library, which had been built by General Electric out of a Quonset hut. As part of the transition, large areas of undeveloped land became city property. Richland's financial dependency on the federal Hanford facility changed little at this time because Hanford's mission as a weapons materials production site continued during the Cold War years.

=== After the production boom ===
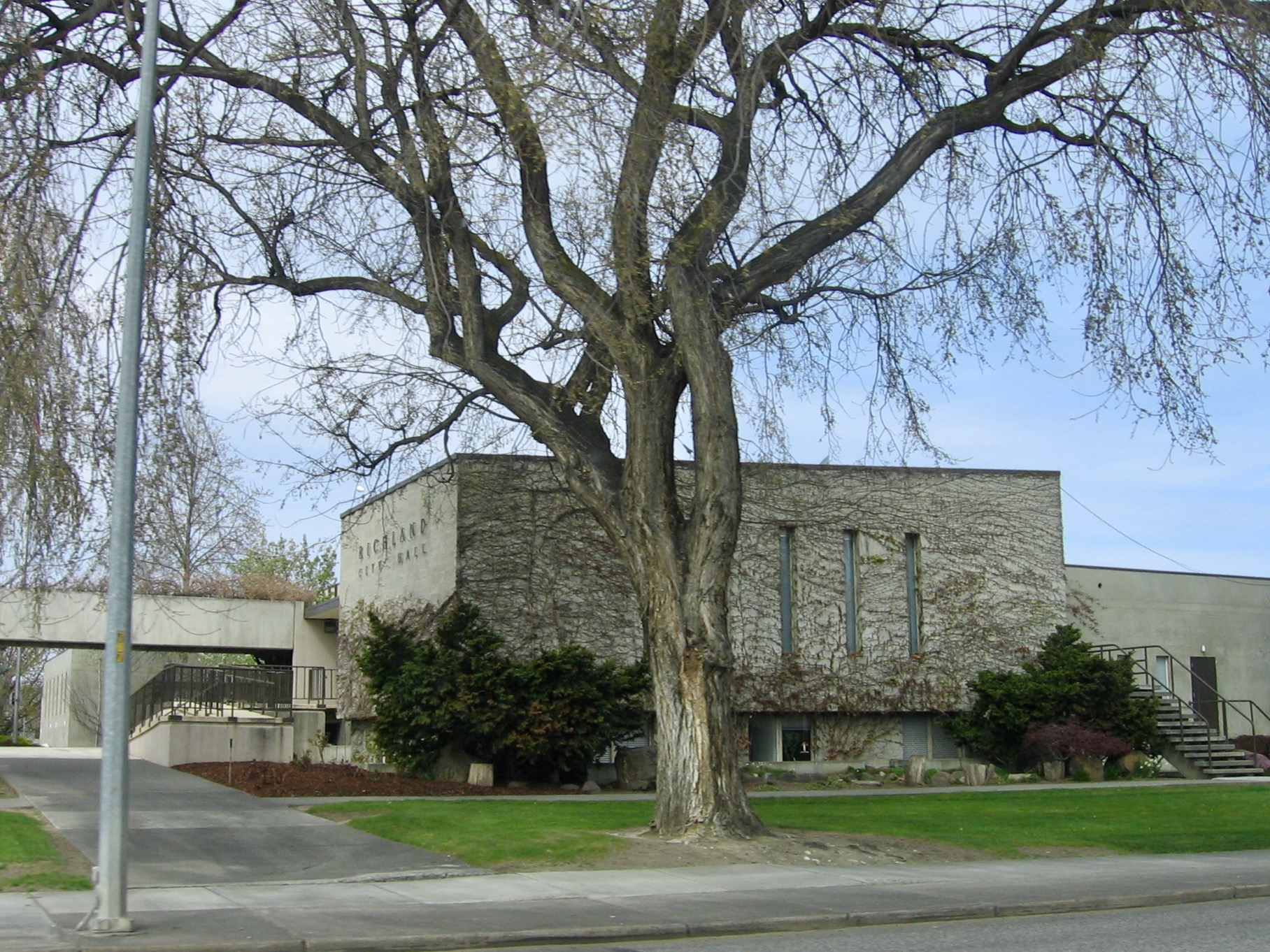
The former Richland City Hall was demolished

With the shutdown of the last production reactor in 1987, the area transitioned to environmental cleanup and technology. Now, many Richland residents are employed at the Hanford site in its environmental cleanup mission.

Richland High School's sports teams are called the Bombers, complete with a mushroom cloud logo. Some of the streets platted after 1958 are named after U.S. Army generals (such as Patton Street, MacArthur Street, Sherman Street, and Pershing Avenue) and after various nuclear themes (Einstein Avenue, Curie Street, Proton Lane, Log Lane, and Nuclear Lane). A local museum, the Reach Museum, tells the story of the cultural, natural, and scientific history of the Hanford Reach and Columbia Basin area; it replaced the now closed Columbia River Exhibition of History, Science, and Technology (CREHST) in 2014.

Washington State University, Tri-Cities was founded in northern Richland in 1989, growing out of a former Joint Graduate Center which had been affiliated with the University of Washington, Oregon State University, and Washington State University. Richland is also home to Kadlec Regional Medical Center. Columbia Basin College's Medical Training Center is near Kadlec Regional Medical Center.

== Government ==
The city of Richland is a full-service city providing police services, fire protection, water utility services, solid waste services, electric utilities, parks and recreational facilities and services, maintenance of city streets and public facilities, and full library services featuring a state-of-the-art library operated by the city. The city pursues community and economic development and offers housing assistance.

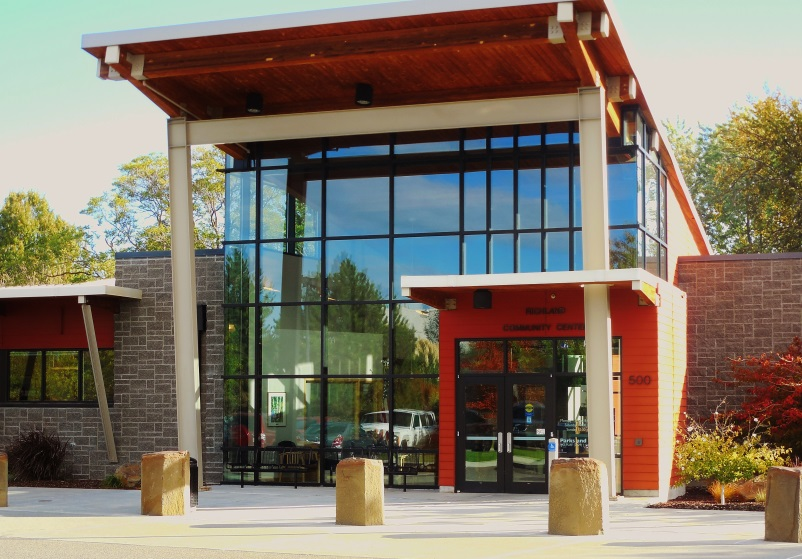
Richland Community Center

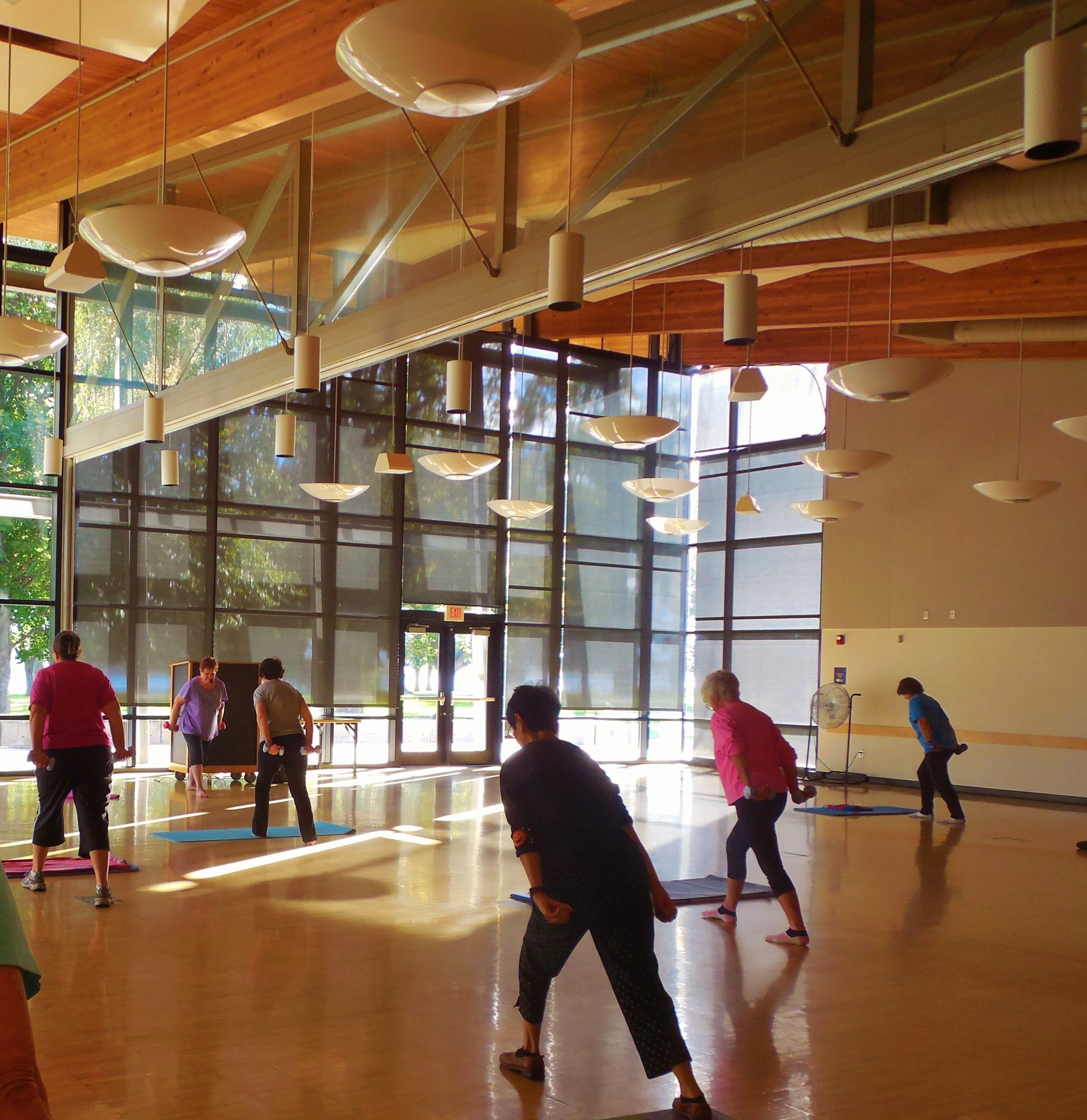
An exercise class in a multipurpose room of the Richland Community Center

The Richland Community Center is adjacent to Howard Amon Park, on the east side of the Columbia River. The building was designed by ARC Architects of Seattle, Washington. Many of its rooms have views of the park and Columbia River, which make it a venue for weddings and receptions, family reunions, birthday parties, business, and community meetings. The rooms are also used for a variety of general education and personal enrichment classes including courses in computer/technology, health & fitness, dance, arts & crafts, dog training, home & gardening, language lessons, and martial arts. The Community Center also serves as a gathering place for group recreation and gaming: cribbage, pinochle, bridge, pool, dominoes, and a host of other social activities are available to the public at large.

More recently, the Richland Community Center has hosted several important civic events including the Green Living Awards and the Fall Carnival. As of 2016, the city plans to rebuild city hall across Jadwin Avenue in the parking lot of the U.S. Federal Courthouse. The former city hall would be sold to eligible businesses.

=== Police services ===
The City of Richland Police Department is composed of approximately 58 commissioned police officers and 15 support staff.

== Economy ==
=== Technology ===
After the end of World War II, Richland continued to be a center of production and research into nuclear energy and related technology. It has been the home of Pacific Northwest National Laboratory (PNNL) since 1965. One of the two Laser Interferometer Gravitational-Wave Observatory sites is located immediately north of Richland. Numerous smaller high technology business and expert consultants have grown up around the Richland Technology Center as well.

==== Preferred Freezer Services Warehouse ====
Richland is home to the largest cold-storage facility on Earth—which is also one of the largest buildings on Earth by volume.

==== Major Employers ====
- Battelle Memorial Institute, operating PNNL
- Bechtel National Inc., building a waste vitrification plant
- Washington River Protection Solutions (a partnership of Amentum, Atkins, and Orano), controlling operations of the nuclear waste tank farms
- Washington Closure Hanford (a partnership of AECOM, Bechtel, and CH2M Hill), providing waste management and cleanup efforts, including decontamination and demolition (D&D) of facilities along the Columbia River
- Hanford Mission Integrated Solutions (a partnership of Leidos, Centerra Group, and Parsons) providing infrastructure and sitewide services
- Central Plateau Cleanup Company (a partnership of Amentum, Atkins, and Fluor), responsible for D&D of facilities on the site's Central Plateau
- EnergySolutions, providing services to the U.S. government
- Energy Northwest, generating nuclear power at a nearby reactor facility
- Framatome creating nuclear fuel
- Lockheed Martin Services, Inc., providing technology services
- The U.S. Department of Energy, which operates the Hanford Site

=== Agriculture ===
Agriculture is important in the Richland area; the Tri-Cities area of the Columbia Basin grows excellent produce. Richland hosts an important food processor, Lamb Weston, which processes potatoes and other foods.

The production of wine in the lower Columbia Basin has become one of the area's main industries. Richland lies at the center of a viticulture area which produces internationally recognized wines in four major Washington appellations and serves as a center for wine tours. The Columbia Valley appellation which surrounds Richland contains over 7,000 hectares planted with wine grapes. On the west, the Yakima Valley appellation includes 5,000 hectares. To the east, the Walla Walla Valley appellation includes 500 hectares of wine grapes.

=== Business and industry ===
The Tri-City Industrial Development Council promotes both agricultural-related and technology-related industries in the region.

=== Top employers ===
According to Richland's 2021 Comprehensive Annual Financial Report, the top employers in the city are:

#	Employer	# of employees
1	Battelle / Pacific Northwest National Laboratory	4,500
2	Kadlec Regional Medical Center	3,532
3	Bechtel National	2,943
4	Washington River Protection Solutions	2,129
5	Hanford Mission Integration Solutions	1,902
6	Central Plateau Cleanup Company	1,682
7	Richland School District	1,500
8	Energy Northwest	1,100
9	Lamb Weston	750
10	Framatome / Areva	700

== Education ==
The Richland School District serves the cities of Richland and West Richland with ten elementary schools, four middle schools, and three high schools. Columbia Basin College, primarily located in Pasco, has a small branch campus in Richland. Washington State University, Tri-Cities, established in North Richland in 1989, sits on the western bank of the Columbia River. The university offers undergraduate and graduate degree programs. It first admitted freshmen and sophomores in the fall of 2007.

== Recreation ==
=== Golf ===
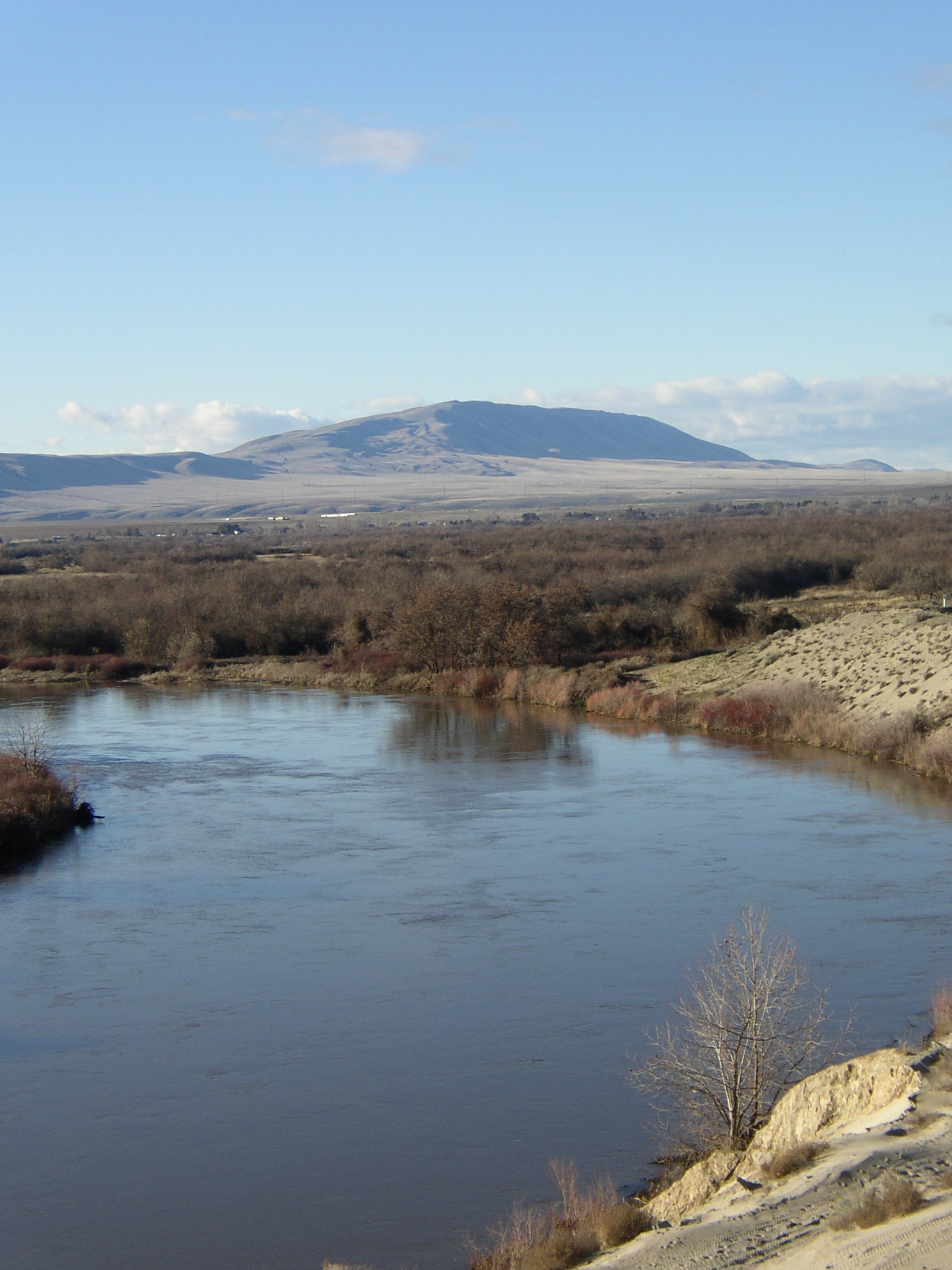
A view of Rattlesnake Mountain from the Horn Rapids Golf Course in Richland

There are three 18-hole golf courses and one 9-hole course in the area.

=== Outdoor activities ===
Richland has developed a number of parks, several of them fronting the Columbia and Yakima Rivers. The rivers provide boating, water skiing, fishing, kayaking and waterfowl hunting opportunities.

Richland is included in a bike trail system in the Tri-Cities which is named The Sacagawea Heritage Trail. The trail is a scenic river ride along the Columbia River through the Tri-Cities of Kennewick, Richland and Pasco. It is a 23-mile multipurpose blacktop loop trail on both sides of the river from Sacagawea State Park at the confluence of the Snake and Columbia Rivers up to the I-182 bridge at the Columbia Point Marina on the upper end. Three bridges join the trails on both sides, providing several ride options. There are numerous trailheads and access parking spots along the route.

Richland lies within a semi-arid, shrub-steppe environment, and has many interesting natural areas within or adjacent to the city:

- The Yakima River delta and wetlands lie within Richland and provide a habitat for many birds and animals. The area around the Yakima delta provides a wooded variation of the normal shrub steppe.
- The Badger Mountain Centennial Preserve protects Badger Mountain, located on the edge of Richland in the Richland GMA area. It provides views of the Tri-Cities and the Columbia and Yakima rivers. A non-profit group, Friends of Badger Mountain, worked to procure this shrub-steppe area that has the most native vegetation intact, and in 2005 built a trail to the summit. The 2-kilometer trail rises 300 meters above the trailhead in Richland.
- The Arid Lands Ecology Reserve, at the western edge of Richland on the Hanford Reservation, is the last remaining large block of undisturbed shrub-steppe habitat in the Pacific Northwest. The site has been closed to the public since the 1940s, preserving its character. It is managed as an environmental research area and wildlife reserve.
- North of Richland, the Hanford Reach, the last free-flowing stretch of the Columbia River in the U.S., provides sightseeing and salmon fishing. This free-flowing stretch flows through the Hanford Reach National Monument, which was created by Presidential proclamation in 2000 and is managed by the U.S. Fish and Wildlife Service. Volunteers are working to construct an interpretive center on Richland's Columbia Point at the confluence of the Yakima and Columbia; in 2006, $22M of the necessary funds were in hand and construction was expected later that year.
- The Amon Creek Natural Preserve in the south part of town protects wetlands around the creek and has several trails.

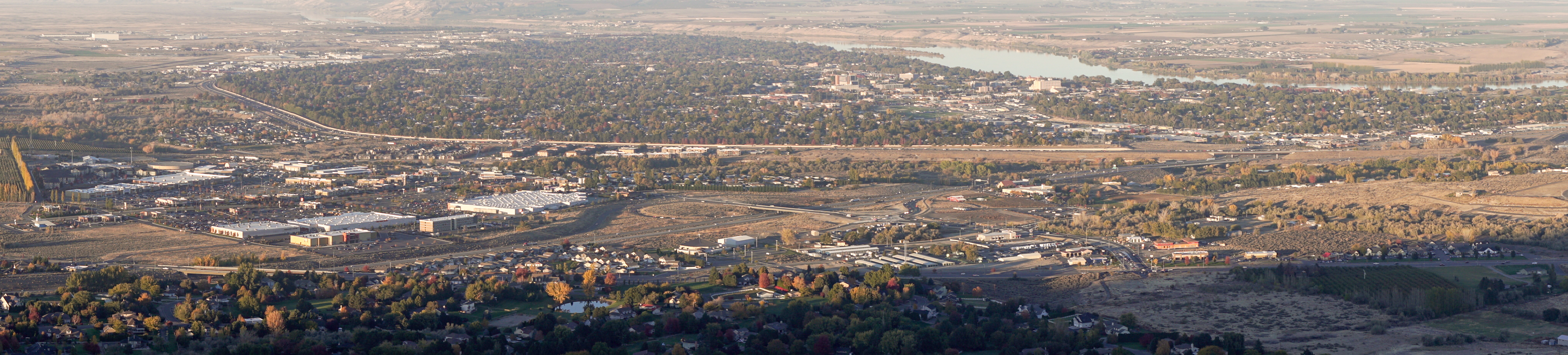
Sweeping views of Queensgate, Downtown, and North Richland as seen from Badger Mountain

=== Sports ===
Sports teams in the immediate area include the Tri-City Americans WHL ice hockey team (which plays in Kennewick), and the Tri-City Dust Devils Single-A baseball team (affiliated with the Los Angeles Angels) which plays in Pasco. Washington State University Tri-Cities has several club sports teams, including in rugby (2016 Northwest Cup Champions), volleyball, men's soccer and women's soccer.

== Geography ==
According to the United States Census Bureau, the city has a total area of 39.11 square miles (101.29 km^{2}), of which, 35.72 square miles (92.51 km^{2}) is land and 3.39 square miles (8.78 km^{2}) is water. Elevation at the airport is 120 m (390 ft).

In the late 1970s, Richland sought to annex 5 square miles (13 km^{2}) of unincorporated land in Franklin County on the east side of the Columbia River, anticipating development following the construction of Interstate 182. The move was blocked by Pasco, who had planned to annex much of the area themselves. The Richland city government filed an appeal against the Franklin County Boundary Review Board in 1983 following their approval of Pasco's claim; the Washington Supreme Court affirmed the Franklin County decision.

=== Richland Wye ===
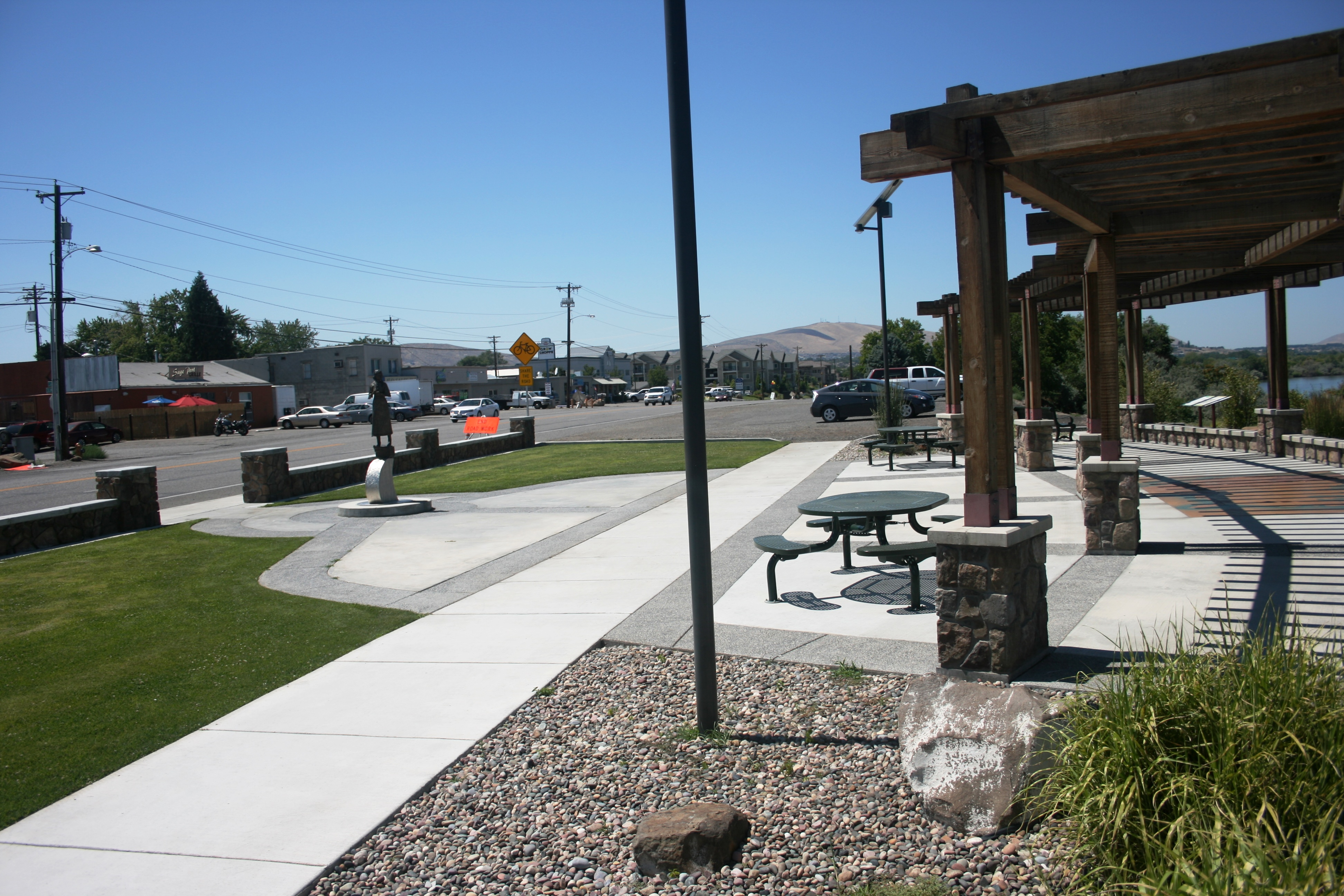
Looking west from a park with a statue commemorating Sacajawea towards Badger Mountain through a business zone

Richland Wye (46°14′17″N 119°14′2″W) is a community within the eastern city limits of Richland. It is the location of the sole access bridge to Bateman Island over the Columbia River.

=== Climate ===
Richland receives about 7 inches (180 mm) of precipitation per year, giving it a semi-arid desert climate and resulting in a shrub-steppe environment. Summers are hot with infrequent thunderstorms, while winters are milder than all of Eastern Washington with snow falling only occasionally. During the 2021 Western North America heat wave, the maximum temperature of 118 °F (48 °C) was recorded in Richland which tied the previous all-time record high temperature in the state of Washington. Nearby, the Hanford Site recorded a high of 120 °F (49 °C), the new state record.

Climate data for Richland, Washington, 1991–2020 normals, extremes 1944–present
Month	Jan	Feb	Mar	Apr	May	Jun	Jul	Aug	Sep	Oct	Nov	Dec	Year
Record high °F (°C)	71 (22)	73 (23)	82 (28)	92 (33)	105 (41)	118 (48)	113 (45)	113 (45)	106 (41)	93 (34)	78 (26)	71 (22)	118 (48)
Mean maximum °F (°C)	57.6 (14.2)	60.4 (15.8)	70.0 (21.1)	79.9 (26.6)	89.3 (31.8)	95.2 (35.1)	101.5 (38.6)	99.9 (37.7)	91.5 (33.1)	78.6 (25.9)	66.0 (18.9)	58.2 (14.6)	102.4 (39.1)
Mean daily maximum °F (°C)	40.6 (4.8)	47.5 (8.6)	57.1 (13.9)	65.1 (18.4)	73.9 (23.3)	80.2 (26.8)	89.3 (31.8)	88.1 (31.2)	78.9 (26.1)	64.3 (17.9)	49.0 (9.4)	39.9 (4.4)	64.5 (18.1)
Daily mean °F (°C)	34.7 (1.5)	38.8 (3.8)	46.1 (7.8)	53.0 (11.7)	61.1 (16.2)	67.3 (19.6)	74.7 (23.7)	73.6 (23.1)	65.2 (18.4)	53.0 (11.7)	41.3 (5.2)	34.1 (1.2)	53.6 (12.0)
Mean daily minimum °F (°C)	28.8 (−1.8)	30.1 (−1.1)	35.1 (1.7)	41.0 (5.0)	48.3 (9.1)	54.4 (12.4)	60.0 (15.6)	59.0 (15.0)	51.4 (10.8)	41.7 (5.4)	33.6 (0.9)	28.4 (−2.0)	42.7 (5.9)
Mean minimum °F (°C)	13.0 (−10.6)	16.8 (−8.4)	24.3 (−4.3)	30.7 (−0.7)	37.5 (3.1)	46.1 (7.8)	52.0 (11.1)	50.7 (10.4)	40.9 (4.9)	28.3 (−2.1)	19.9 (−6.7)	14.6 (−9.7)	7.9 (−13.4)
Record low °F (°C)	−21 (−29)	−22 (−30)	7 (−14)	23 (−5)	30 (−1)	38 (3)	41 (5)	39 (4)	31 (−1)	13 (−11)	−6 (−21)	−10 (−23)	−22 (−30)
Average precipitation inches (mm)	1.04 (26)	0.67 (17)	0.64 (16)	0.62 (16)	0.63 (16)	0.56 (14)	0.23 (5.8)	0.13 (3.3)	0.29 (7.4)	0.54 (14)	0.87 (22)	1.07 (27)	7.29 (184.5)
Average snowfall inches (cm)	1.9 (4.8)	1.9 (4.8)	0.2 (0.51)	0.0 (0.0)	0.0 (0.0)	0.0 (0.0)	0.0 (0.0)	0.0 (0.0)	0.0 (0.0)	trace	0.1 (0.25)	2.3 (5.8)	6.4 (16.16)
Average precipitation days (≥ 0.01 in)	11.8	8.7	8.1	7.1	7.1	4.7	2.2	2.1	3.1	6.7	10.3	11.9	83.8
Average snowy days (≥ 0.1 in)	1.5	0.9	0.3	0.0	0.0	0.0	0.0	0.0	0.0	0.0	0.4	1.9	5.0
Source 1: NOAA (snow/snow days 1981–2010)
Source 2: National Weather Service

== Demographics ==
Historical population
Census	Pop.	Note	%±
1910	350		—
1920	279		−20.3%
1930	208		−25.4%
1940	247		18.8%
1950	21,809		8,729.6%
1960	23,548		8.0%
1970	26,290		11.6%
1980	33,578		27.7%
1990	32,315		−3.8%
2000	38,708		19.8%
2010	48,058		24.2%
2020	60,560		26.0%
2023 (est.)	63,757		5.3%
U.S. Decennial Census

Based on per capita income, one of the more reliable measures of affluence, Richland ranks 83rd of 522 areas ranked in the state of Washington—the highest rank achieved in Benton County.

=== 2020 census ===
As of the 2020 census, Richland had a population of 60,560. The median age was 37.5 years. 24.2% of residents were under the age of 18 and 17.4% of residents were 65 years of age or older. For every 100 females there were 98.1 males, and for every 100 females age 18 and over there were 96.1 males age 18 and over. In the city, 97.9% lived in urban areas, while 2.1% lived in rural areas.

There were 24,327 households in Richland, of which 30.3% had children under the age of 18 living in them. Of all households, 49.4% were married-couple households, 18.6% were households with a male householder and no spouse or partner present, and 24.6% were households with a female householder and no spouse or partner present. About 28.3% of all households were made up of individuals and 11.5% had someone living alone who was 65 years of age or older. There were 25,524 housing units, of which 4.7% were vacant. The homeowner vacancy rate was 0.8% and the rental vacancy rate was 5.8%.

Racial composition as of the 2020 census
Race	Number	Percent
White	46,646	77.0%
Black or African American	931	1.5%
American Indian and Alaska Native	431	0.7%
Asian	3,161	5.2%
Native Hawaiian and Other Pacific Islander	161	0.3%
Some other race	3,210	5.3%
Two or more races	6,020	9.9%
Hispanic or Latino (of any race)	8,030	13.3%

=== 2010 census ===
As of the 2010 census, there were 48,058 people, 19,707 households, and 12,974 families residing in the city. The population density was 1,345.4 inhabitants per square mile (519.5/km^{2}). There were 20,876 housing units at an average density of 584.4 per square mile (225.6/km^{2}). The racial makeup of the city was 87.0% White, 1.4% African American, 0.8% Native American, 4.7% Asian, 0.1% Pacific Islander, 2.7% from other races, and 3.2% from two or more races. Hispanic and Latino people of any race were 7.8% of the population.

There were 19,707 households, of which 31.0% had children under the age of 18 living with them, 51.6% were married couples living together, 10.0% had a female householder with no husband present, 4.2% had a male householder with no wife present, and 34.2% were non-families. 28.2% of all households were made up of individuals, and 10.1% had someone living alone who was 65 years of age or older. The average household size was 2.42 and the average family size was 2.97. The median age in the city was 39.4 years. 24.2% of residents were under the age of 18; 8.1% were between the ages of 18 and 24; 24.7% were from 25 to 44; 28.4% were from 45 to 64; and 14.6% were 65 years of age or older. The gender makeup of the city was 49.0% male and 51.0% female.

=== 2000 census ===
As of the 2000 census, there were 38,708 people, 15,549 households, and 10,682 families living in the city. The population density was 1,111.8 people per square mile (429.3 people/km^{2}). There were 16,458 housing units at an average density of 472.7 per square mile (182.5/km^{2}). The racial makeup of the city was 89.55% White, 1.37% African American, 0.76% Native American, 4.06% Asian, 0.11% Pacific Islander, 1.85% from other races, and 2.31% from two or more races. Hispanic or Latino people of any race were 4.72% of the population.

There were 15,549 households, out of which 34.1% had children under the age of 18 living with them, 56% were married couples living together, 9.3% had a female householder with no husband present, and 31.3% were non-families. 27.2% of all households were made up of individuals, and 9.4% had someone living alone who was 65 years of age or older. The average household size was 2.48 and the average family size was 3.02. In the city, the population was spread out, with 27.2% under the age of 18, 7.5% from 18 to 24, 27.1% from 25 to 44, 25.4% from 45 to 64, and 12.8% who were 65 years of age or older. The median age was 38 years. For every 100 females, there were 96 males. For every 100 females age 18 and over, there were 93.2 males.

The median income for a household in the city was $53,092, and the median income for a family was $82,354 (Money CNN). Males had a median income of $52,648 versus $30,472 for females. The per capita income for the city was $25,494. About 5.7% of families and 8.2% of the population were below the poverty line, including 10.8% of those under age 18 and 5.6% of those age 65 or over.

== Transportation ==
Richland is served by Richland Airport, located in the city, as well as the Tri-Cities Airport, located in nearby Pasco. Both have only domestic flights. Also in Pasco is an Amtrak station, where the Portland-Chicago Empire Builder makes a stop. Ben Franklin Transit provides bus transportation within Richland and the Tri-Cities area.

Interstate 82 runs to the west of the city and connects to Yakima, Washington and Interstate 90, to the north, and Hermiston, Oregon and Interstate 84, to the south. Interstate 182 provides the primary east–west connection among the Tri-cities, Richland, Kennewick, and Pasco.

== Notable people ==
- James (Jim) F. Albaugh – executive vice president, The Boeing Company
- Stu Barnes – National Hockey League former player; an owner and coach of the Tri-City Americans
- Kayla Barron – NASA astronaut
- Beefy – nerdcore artist; real name Keith A. Moore
- Tyler Brayton – National Football League player
- Travis Buck – Major League Baseball player and assistant baseball coach at Loyola Marymount University in Los Angeles
- Orson Scott Card – science fiction writer; born in Richland
- Gene Conley – MLB pitcher and National Basketball Association player, Richland High School
- Larry Coryell – jazz guitarist, RHS class of 1961
- Westley Allan Dodd – serial killer and child molester
- Santino Fontana – Broadway and film actor
- Liz Heaston – first female to score points in a college football game (played for Willamette University in Salem, Oregon
- Ty Jones – NHL player and first round pick in the 1997 NHL draft
- Kurt Kafentzis – NFL player
- Mark Kafentzis – NFL player
- Olaf Kölzig – retired NHL goaltender and owner of the Tri-City Americans
- James N. Mattis – United States Secretary of Defense; general in the U.S. Marine Corps
- Mike McCormack – U.S. Representative from the Fourth Congressional District
- Jimmy McLarnin – Irish boxer
- Nate Mendel – Sunny Day Real Estate and Foo Fighters bassist
- Michael Peterson – country western singer
- Jason Repko – MLB player
- Leon Rice – college basketball coach
- Kathryn Ruemmler – White House counsel to President Barack Obama
- Hope Solo – United States women's national soccer team goalkeeper
- Sharon Tate – actress; Miss Richland, 1959
- John Archibald Wheeler – theoretical physicist
- Rachel Willis-Sørensen – operatic soprano

== Sister city ==
Richland's sister city is:

- Hsinchu, Taiwan

== See also ==
- Ben Franklin Transit
- Kate Brown
- Hanford High School
- Hanford Site
- Pacific Northwest National Laboratory
- Washington State University, Tri-Cities
