= Larry Leon Hamlin =

Larry Leon Hamlin (September 25, 1948 – June 6, 2007) was the founder and artistic director of the North Carolina Black Repertory Company as well as the founder and executive director of the National Black Theatre Festival. His favorite personal expression was the word "marvtastic", a blend of the words "marvelous" and "fantastic".

== Biography ==
Born in Reidsville, North Carolina, Hamlin was a lover of theatre from an early age. Although he earned a degree in business administration at Johnson & Wales University in Providence, Rhode Island, he later studied theatre at Brown University.

During his studies at Brown, Hamlin was called back to North Carolina for a family emergency. After the matter was resolved, Hamlin remained in Winston-Salem and established the North Carolina Black Repertory Company, the first local black theatre organization in the state. Ten years later, he founded the National Black Theatre Festival with the support of Maya Angelou in order to feature the best in African-American theatre.

Hamlin died at his home in Pfafftown, North Carolina following an extended illness.
