= Reach Museum =

Museum in Richland, Washington, US

The Reach Museum

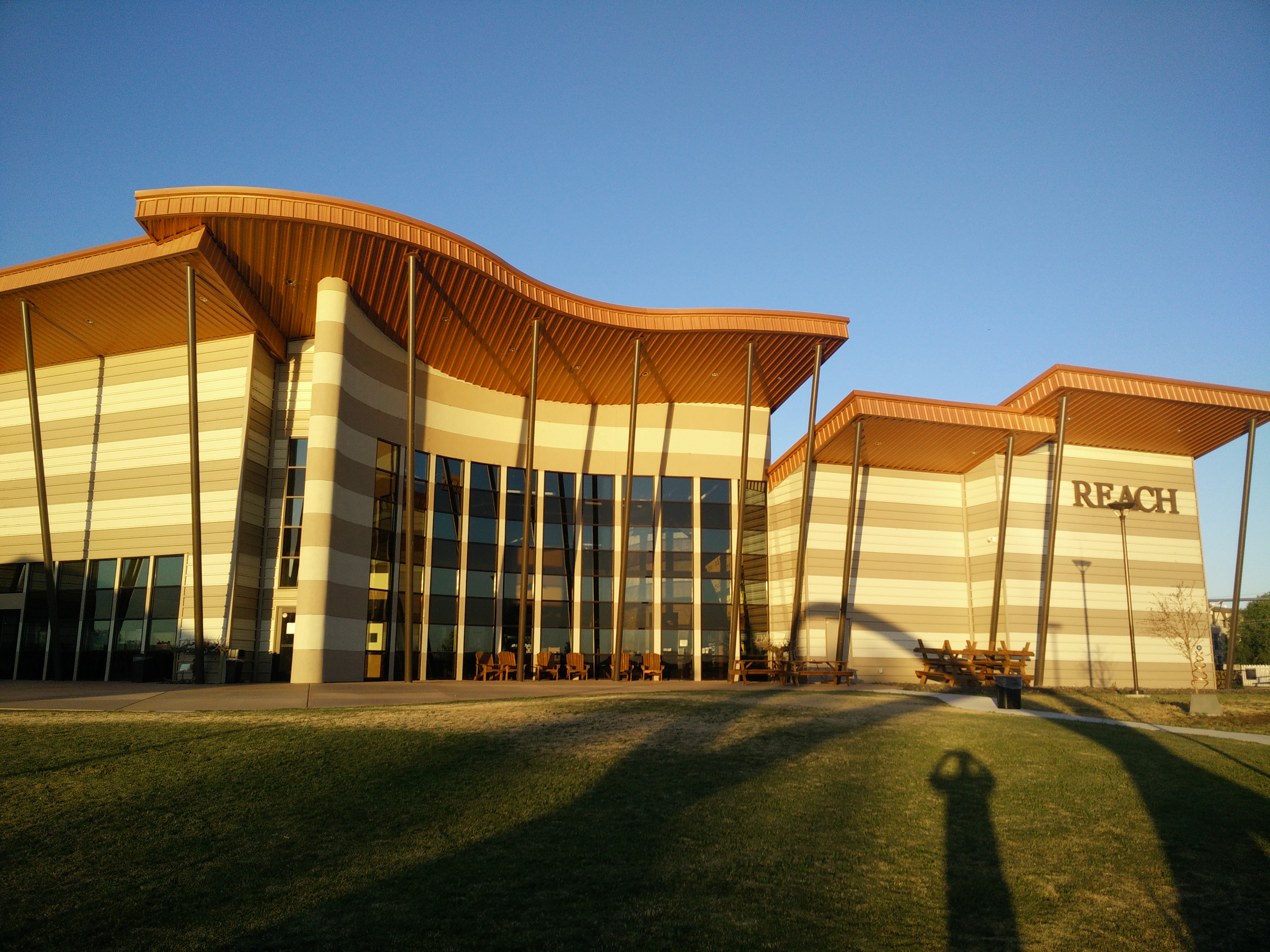
- Established: 2014
- Location: 1943 Columbia Park Trail; Richland, Washington
- Coordinates: 46.236205°N 119.216526°W
- Type: History, natural history
- Website: http://visitthereach.us

The Reach Museum, also known as the Hanford Reach Interpretive Center, is a museum and visitor center for Hanford Reach National Monument located in Richland, Washington. The center tells a story of the cultural, natural, and scientific history of the Hanford Reach and Columbia Basin area, as well as promoting tourism.

The Columbia River Exhibition of History, Science, and Technology (CREHST) was the predecessor that transitioned into what is now the Hanford Reach Interpretive Center.

The Reach opened on July 1, 2014.

== Features ==
The Reach is host to two main exhibit galleries. The exhibit in gallery one tells the story of the history of Hanford Reach and the surrounding area. Gallery two presents the story of the Hanford Site's early days and its role in the Manhattan Project. The museum also hosts a rotating exhibit which tells various stories of local history. There is an outdoor stage for various events and musicals. Educational activities are offered by the center, from camps for kids to current environmental forums, and the museum hosts off site tours to several local areas.

== Building ==
The Reach has a 14,000-square-foot (1,300 m^{2}) ground floor which contains the galleries, rotating exhibit, a great hall, and a store. The museum has seen approximately 70,000 visitors since opening in July 2014, and has worked with about 15,000 students as of December, 2015.

The project development lasted more than 10 years and had several bid phases. Construction on the facility started in 2013.
