= Seminole language =

There are two languages spoken by the Seminole tribe of the southeastern United States, both of the Muskogean language family:

- Muscogee Seminole language, spoken in Oklahoma and Florida
- Mikasuki language, spoken in Florida

In addition, Afro-Seminole Creole is spoken by Mascogos in Coahuila, Mexico, and by some Black Seminoles in Texas and Oklahoma.
