= The Black Academy of Arts and Letters =

The Black Academy of Arts and Letters (TBAAL) is a cultural organization based in Dallas, Texas that supports African Americans in the visual and performing arts. It hosts over one hundred performances each year.

TBAAL is located in the Kay Bailey Hutchison Convention Center Dallas (KBHCCD) in downtown Dallas. In March 2025, it was temporarily moved to Fair Park during renovations of the KBHCCD.

== History ==
=== BAAL (1969-1974) ===
The original Black Academy of Arts and Letters (BAAL) was founded on March 29, 1969 in Boston, Massachusetts and incorporated as a non-profit organization in New York in June 1969. BAAL was "dedicated to the defining and promoting cultural achievement of black people." According to its first president, Dr. C. Eric Lincoln, "A Black Academy of Arts and Letters is one way of coming to terms with a society that has not yet made up its mind about the role of color". Notable members at its founding include Charles White, Robert Hooks, Julian "Cannonball" Adderley, Alvin Ailey, Sidney Poitier and Duke Ellington. BAAL underwent administrative cuts in 1972 and became defunct in 1974.

=== JBAAL and TBAAL (1977-present) ===
In 1977, Curtis King founded the Junior Black Academy for Arts and Letters in Dallas (JBAAL) as the successor to BAAL. In 1997, the organization changed its name to The Black Academy of Arts and Letters (TBAAL).

Since 2014, TBAAL's archival materials have been housed at the University of North Texas (UNT) Libraries. In 2022, UNT received a $126,989 grant from the National Historic Publications and Records Commission to digitally preserve TBAAL's archival audio and video recordings.
