= The Actors' Temple =

Synagogue in Manhattan, New York

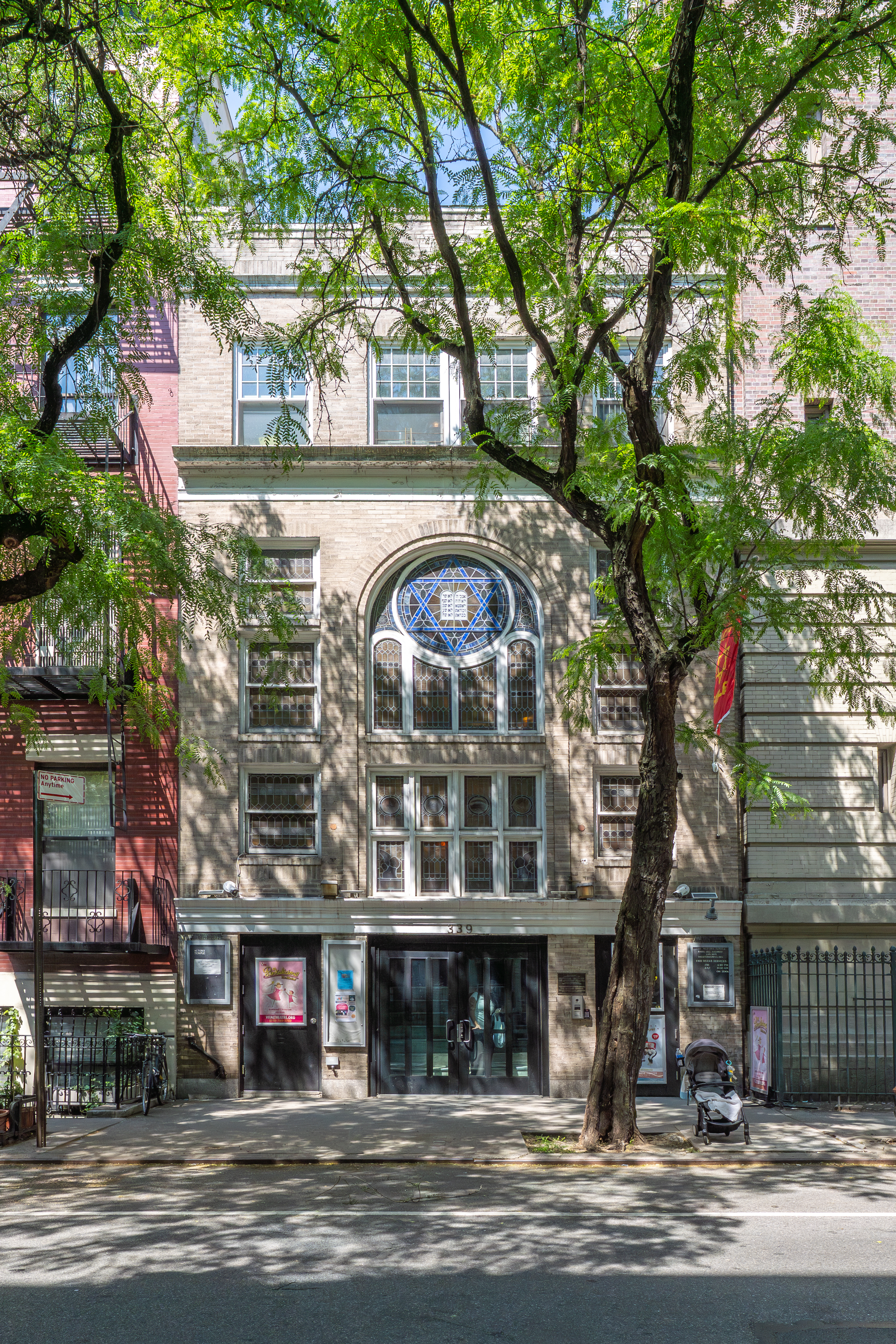
- The Actors' Temple in May 2026

- Location in Manhattan

Religion
- Affiliation: Judaism
- Rite: Non-denominational
- Ecclesiastical or organisational status: Synagogue
- Leadership: Rabbi Jill Hausman
- Status: Active

Location
- Location: 339 West 47th Street, Hell's Kitchen, Manhattan, New York City, New York 10036
- Country: United States
- Coordinates: 40°45′40″N 73°59′21″W

Architecture
- Architect: Sydney F. Oppenheimer
- Type: Synagogue
- Style: Classical Revival
- Established: 1917 (as a congregation)
- Completed: 1925

Website
- theactorstemple.org
- Actors' Temple
- U.S. National Register of Historic Places
- New York State Register of Historic Places
- NRHP reference No.: 05000445
- NYSRHP No.: 06101.015217

Significant dates
- Added to NRHP: May 19, 2005
- Designated NYSRHP: March 25, 2005

The Actors' Temple, officially named Congregation Ezrath Israel, is a non-denominational Jewish synagogue located at 339 West 47th Street, in the Hell's Kitchen neighborhood of Manhattan, New York City, New York, United States.

== History ==
The congregation was founded in 1917 as the West Side Hebrew Relief Association, an Orthodox congregation for the shopkeepers in the area. The synagogue has been located at its current site since 1923, being the synagogue of choice for Jews in the entertainment industry nearby. Many vaudeville, musical theater, television, and nightclub performers attended services there, including Sophie Tucker, Shelley Winters, Milton Berle, Al Jolson, Jack Benny, Joe E. Lewis, Edward G. Robinson, as well as two of the Three Stooges. Rabbi Bernard Birstein, an aspiring actor himself, was the synagogue's first rabbi; he died in 1959.

The congregation declined in the wake of World War II as New York-based actors moved to California and the neighborhood changed. The congregation diminished from 300 members to approximately 30 by 2009. In 2005, in order to bring in additional income, the temple started renting out dance rehearsal space to New Dance Group and temporarily transforming into a theatre for plays. However, even with this additional income, the $120,000 annual operating costs used up the $2 million endowment by 2009. Despite these challenges, the temple continues to operate. In 2011, the temple had a fundraising program and about 150 dues-paying members, with an average Erev Shabbat worship attendance of 20–30 people.

The congregation initially adhered to Orthodox Judaism but subsequently transitioned to Conservative Judaism and, later, to a non-denominational approach to Judaism.

The synagogue's rabbi, Jill Hausman, made an appearance in the Weekend Update portion of the season 49 finale of Saturday Night Live, sitting next to Colin Jost during his delivery of jokes written by co-host Michael Che.
