= International Black Theatre Festival =

African-American festival in North Carolina

Coordinates: 36.09875°N 80.24863°W

The International Black Theatre Festival (IBTF), formerly the National Black Theatre Festival (NBTF), was founded in 1989 by Larry Leon Hamlin in Winston-Salem, North Carolina. Serving as its executive director, Hamlin’s goal in creating the Festival was "to unite black theatre companies in America to ensure the survival of the genre into the next millennium." Held biennially since 1989 for six days, the IBTF showcases the best in African-American theater.

== Beginnings ==
As he was doing research for a magazine article in the late 1980s, Hamlin discovered a disconnect between the number of black theatre companies at that time. He concluded that a festival could serve as a method to bring these companies together, and he contacted renowned author and poet Maya Angelou for support. Together, they raised $500,000 in grants and contributions to finance the festival's operating costs. Hamlin stated that the festival "helped dispel a misconception that black theaters were not professional enough to warrant grant money."

The first Festival attracted 10,000 people and offered 30 different performances by 17 of America’s best professional black theatre companies. Its theme was "An International Celebration and Reunion of Spirit". Angelou served as the Festival's first chairperson, and other prominent African-American performers lent their professional and financial support. It was covered by both the national and international media with wide acclaim.

== Challenges ==
The IBTF has been successful, but not without difficulties. In 2001, the Festival faced serious financial troubles that threatened its existence. Several funding sources reduced support and the budget for the Festival was left with a $300,000 deficit. In spite of this setback, Hamlin did not cancel the festival and was able to raise enough money to compensate for the loss. He believed that African-American theatre was important and was able to make his dream a success.

== Today ==
The IBTF brings nearly 60,000 people to Winston-Salem. In addition to over 100 theatrical performances, highlights of the Festival are the Opening Night Gala, the Readers' Theatre of New Works, the Youth/Celebrity Project, International Colloquia, the International Vendor's Market, a poetry slam, and various workshops and seminars. More than 50 celebrities can be expected to attend the Festival during its run.

The event was renamed to the International Black Theatre Festival beginning in 2024.

The 2007 festival was the first without the direct guidance of Hamlin, who died on June 6, 2007; organizers continued preparations though his presence was missed.

The 2009 NBTF was held August 3–8, 2009, with celebrity co-chairs Ted Lange and Wendy Raquel Robinson.

The 2011 NBTF was held August 1–6, 2011, with celebrity co-chairs Lamman Rucker and T'Keyah Crystal Keymáh.

The 2013 NBTF was held July 29-August 3, 2013, with celebrity co-chairs Tonya Pinkins and Dorien Wilson.

The 2015 NBTF was held August 3-8, 2015, with celebrity co-chairs Debbi Morgan and Darnell Williams.

The 2017 NBTF was held July 31-August 5, 2017, with celebrity co-chairs Anna Maria Horsford and Obba Babatundé.

The 2019 NBTF was held July 29-August 3, 2019, with celebrity co-chairs Margaret Avery and Chester Gregory.

The 2022 NBTF was held August 1-6, 2022, with celebrity co-chairs Lisa Arrindell and Petri Hawkins-Byrd.

The 2024 IBTF will be held July 29–August 3, 2024, with celebrity co-chairs Clifton Davis and Tamara Tunie.
