= Moses Lake North, Washington =

Moses Lake North
- Census-designated place
- Location of Moses Lake North, Washington
- Coordinates: 47°11′42″N 119°19′04″W
- Country: United States
- State: Washington
- County: Grant

Area
  - Total: 6.1 sq mi (15.7 km^{2})
  - Land: 6.1 sq mi (15.7 km^{2})
  - Water: 0 sq mi (0.0 km^{2})
- Elevation: 1,175 ft (358 m)

Population (2020)
  - Total: 4,050
  - Density: 730/sq mi (281/km^{2})
- Time zone: UTC-8 (Pacific (PST))
  - Summer (DST): UTC-7 (PDT)
- ZIP code: 98837
- Area code: 509
- FIPS code: 53-47280
- GNIS feature ID: 2408872

Moses Lake North is a census-designated place (CDP) in Grant County, Washington, United States. It is also included in the Moses Lake micropolitan area. The population was 4,050 at the 2020 census.

== Geography ==
Moses Lake North is located in eastern Grant County and is bordered to the east by a northern extension of the city limits of Moses Lake, and to the south by the Cascade Valley CDP. The Moses Lake North CDP contains much of the land previously occupied by Larson Air Force Base, including the terminal and runways of Grant County International Airport and former base housing.

Washington State Route 17 runs along the western edge of the CDP, leading south into downtown Moses Lake and northwest 14 miles (23 km) to Ephrata.

According to the United States Census Bureau, the CDP has a total area of 6.1 square miles (15.7 km^{2}), all of it land.

Big Bend Community College is in the CDP near the Grant County Airport terminal.

== Demographics ==
Historical population
Census	Pop.	Note	%±
1970	2,672		—
1980	3,348		25.3%
1990	3,677		9.8%
2000	4,232		15.1%
2010	4,418		4.4%
2020	4,050		−8.3%
U.S. Decennial Census; 1960 1970 1980 1990; 2000 2010 2020

Moses Lake North first appeared as an unincorporated community in the 1970 U.S. census; and as a census designated place in the 1980 U.S. census.

=== 2000 census ===
As of the census of 2000, there were 4,232 people, 1,151 households, and 926 families residing in the CDP. The population density was 689.4 people per square mile (266.1/km^{2}). There were 1,278 housing units at an average density of 80.4/km^{2} (208.2/mi^{2}). The racial makeup of the CDP was 72.38% White, 5.01% African American, 1.75% Native American, 0.66% Asian, 0.05% Pacific Islander, 14.72% from other races, and 5.43% from two or more races. Hispanic or Latino of any race were 24.22% of the population.

There were 1,151 households, out of which 55.7% had children under the age of 18 living with them, 52.0% were married couples living together, 22.4% had a female householder with no husband present, and 19.5% were non-families. 13.6% of all households were made up of individuals, and 4.0% had someone living alone who was 65 years of age or older. The average household size was 3.41 and the average family size was 3.72.

In the CDP, the population was spread out, with 40.5% under the age of 18, 15.1% from 18 to 24, 25.4% from 25 to 44, 13.8% from 45 to 64, and 5.2% who were 65 years of age or older. The median age was 22 years. For every 100 females, there were 101.7 males. For every 100 females age 18 and over, there were 96.1 males.

The median income for a household in the CDP was $26,645, and the median income for a family was $26,496. Males had a median income of $28,966 versus $20,052 for females. The per capita income for the CDP was $9,134. About 29.3% of families and 36.8% of the population were below the poverty line, including 42.4% of those under age 18 and 27.0% of those age 65 or over.

== Transportation ==
Grant County International Airport is in Moses Lake North.

== Education ==
The area is served by the Moses Lake School District. Moses Lake High School is the district's sole comprehensive high school.

Big Bend Community College is in Moses Lake North.
