= KDRM =

- Moses Lake, Washington; United States
- Broadcast area: Moses Lake, Washington
- Frequency: 99.3 MHz
- Branding: Mix 99.3

Programming
- Format: Adult hits

Ownership
- Owner: Jeffery Huffman; (Jacobs Radio Programming, LLC)
- Sister stations: KBSN

History
- First air date: November 1, 1989
- Former call signs: KBSN-FM (1989)
- Call sign meaning: DReaM (former branding)

Technical information
- Licensing authority: FCC
- Facility ID: 35596
- Class: A
- ERP: 3,000 watts
- HAAT: 61 meters
- Transmitter coordinates: 47°5′54″N 119°17′47″W
- Translator: 107.5 K298BR (Wenatchee)

Links
- Public license information: Public file; LMS
- Webcast: Listen live
- Website: KDRM Online

KDRM (99.3 FM) is a radio station licensed to Moses Lake, Washington, United States. The station is owned by Jeffery Huffman, through licensee Jacobs Radio Programming, LLC. The transmitter for KDRM is located on Marsh Island, next to the transmitter for KBSN, its sister station on AM 1470.

KDRM broadcasts live at local events including the Spring Festival (aka Springfest) and Grant County Fair. Moses Lake High School sports and Seattle Seahawks are broadcast on KBSN.

== History ==
The station had been known as KDRM. On November 1, 1989, the station changed its call sign to KBSN-FM but the next day changed back to the KDRM call sign.

On January 1, 2023, KDRM and sister station KBSN were sold to Jacobs Radio Programming. The sale, at a price of $50,000, was consummated on March 31, 2023.
