= Beezley Hills =

Range of hills in Grant County, Washington

- Location within Washington (state)

Highest point
- Peak: Monument Hill
- Elevation: 879.7 m (2,886 ft)
- Coordinates: 47°19′13″N 119°48′04″W

Geography
- Country: United States
- State: Washington
- Region: Eastern Washington
- Range coordinates: 47°19′34″N 119°45′35″W
- Parent range: Yakima Fold Belt

Geology
- Rock type: Miocene Columbia River Basalt Group

The Beezley Hills are a range of hills, about 5 miles (8.0 km) north of Quincy in Grant County, Washington with a maximum elevation of 2,882 feet (878 m) or 2,886 feet (879.7 m). (Note: 2,882 ft (878 m) NGVD 29) (Note: 2,886 ft (879.7 m) NAVD 88)

The city of Ephrata, Washington, at the east end of the hills, was originally called Beezley Springs, named after horse rancher Frank Beezley.

== Geography ==
The hills rise from the east bank of the Columbia River between Moses Coulee and Frenchman Gap. They extend about 25 miles (40 km) to Ephrata and are part of the geological formation known as the Yakima Fold Belt, a group of anticlines. The next member of the fold belt is the roughly parallel Frenchman Hills to the south. Between the two ridges, Interstate 90 and Washington State Route 28 run through the Quincy Basin (the latter less than 5 miles (8 km) south of the Beezley Hills), a rich agricultural and vinicultural area (see Quincy-Columbia Basin Irrigation District).

Several springs occur on the lower slopes of the hills. In addition to Ephrata, formerly Beezley Springs (also spelled Beasley Springs), there are Baird Springs, Two Springs, and Willow Springs. The Grant County courthouse in Ephrata is geothermally heated from a hot spring.

Monument Hill is the highest point in the Beezley Hills (Note: "The Beezley Hills rise from the foothills to an elevation of 2,882 feet at Monument Hill" in Federal Register 2012) and the second highest summit in Grant County at 2,882 feet (878 m) or 2,886 feet (879.7 m). The high point of Grant County is a 2,899-foot (884 m) summit (47.3822°N 119.8124°W) unofficially named Ulysses S. Peak, four miles north of Monument Hill and across Lynch Coulee from Monument Hill.

Beezley Hills formed the northern barrier to the ice age Missoula Floods that poured out through Quincy Basin and over Babcock Ridge to reach the sea.

=== Recreation areas and preserves ===
The Beezley Hills Recreation Area (47°19.103′N 119°33.734′W, near Ephrata, Washington) has 20 miles (32 km) of trails and opened in 2012. The Beezley Burn is an annual cross-country mountain bike competition that ran there for the eighth year in 2014. It starts and ends in Ephrata, with a course that extends about 500 feet (150 m) up into the east end of the Beezley Hills.

An earlier footrace in 2000 was also called the Beezley Burn and followed a similar course. (Note: Spelled Beasley Hill at Othello Outlook 2000)

The 4,788-acre (1,938 ha) Beezley Hills Preserve is part of a larger, 30,000-acre (12,000 ha) Moses Coulee/Beezley Hills Nature Conservancy preserve. They are all part of a 400,000-acre (1,600 km^{2}) functional shrub-steppe ecoregion, comparable in size to the island of Oahu.

== Flora and fauna ==
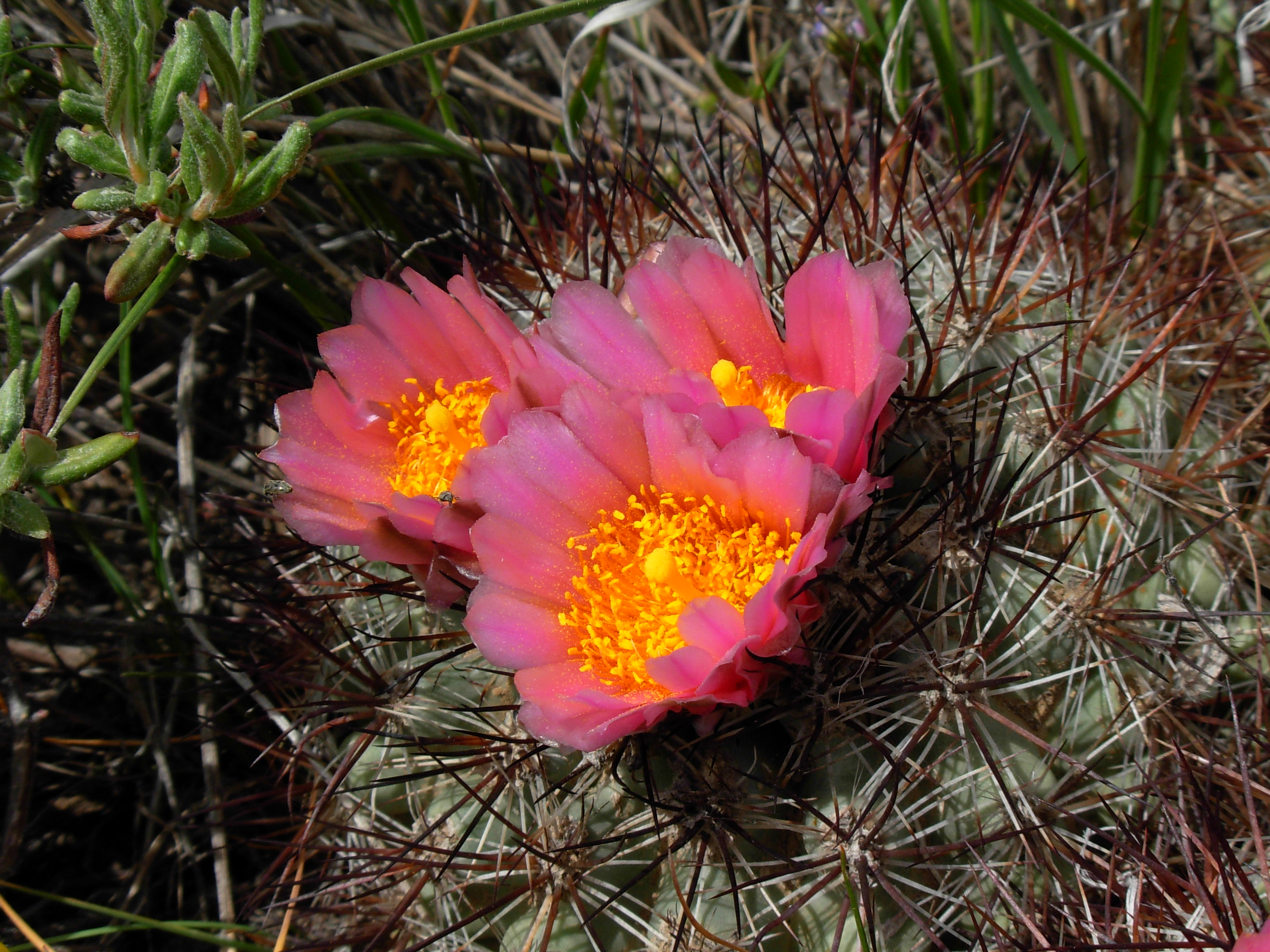
Hedgehog cactus on Whiskey Dick Mountain near Beezley Hills

Beezley Hills Preserve lies in or adjacent to the Channeled Scablands desert; northern Grant County receives 10–15 inches (250–380 mm) of rain annually. The preserve contains many arid climate species.

=== Cacti ===
Flora in the Beezley Hills include Pediocactus simpsonii (hedgehog cactus) and Opuntia polyacantha (prickly pear). The latter was called "quite rare" in Washington by one author, who noted it was listed as nonexistent in the state by many authorities.

=== Pygmy rabbit ===
The Columbia Basin pygmy rabbit, listed as an endangered species in the United States, is endemic to the Columbia Basin. An active conservation and endangered species recovery program is under way with participation from the United States Fish and Wildlife Service (FWS), the Washington State Department of Fish and Wildlife and The Nature Conservancy, with the Beezley Hills designated a "recovery emphasis area" by FWS.
