= KBSN =

- Moses Lake, Washington; United States
- Frequency: 1470 kHz
- Branding: Real Country 1470

Programming
- Format: Classic country

Ownership
- Owner: Jeffery Huffman; (Jacobs Radio Programming, LLC)
- Sister stations: KDRM

History
- First air date: November 1947 (as KSEM)
- Former call signs: KSEM (1947–1984)
- Call sign meaning: Columbia BaSiN

Technical information
- Licensing authority: FCC
- Facility ID: 35597
- Class: B
- Power: 5,000 watts day 1,000 watts night
- Transmitter coordinates: 47°6′16″N 119°17′32″W
- Translator: 107.7 K299CC (Ephrata)

Links
- Public license information: Public file; LMS
- Website: mix993kdrm.com

KBSN (1470 AM) is a classic country radio station licensed to Moses Lake, Washington, United States. The station is owned by Jeffery Huffman, through licensee Jacobs Radio Programming, LLC. The transmitter for KBSN is located on Marsh Island next to the transmitter for KDRM, its sister station on 99.3 FM.

KBSN is the primary station for Moses Lake High School sports. KBSN is also the primary broadcaster in Moses Lake for the Seattle Seahawks. KBSN and/or KDRM broadcast at local events including the Spring Festival (a.k.a. Springfest) and Grant County Fair.

On February 23, 2023, KBSN flipped to classic country "Real Country 1470". It continues to cover local news and sports along with sister station KDRM.
