= Moses Lake School District =

School district in Washington, United States

Moses Lake School District (MLSD) is a school district headquartered in Moses Lake, Washington.

The district includes Moses Lake, Cascade Valley, Moses Lake North, and Wheeler.

== History ==
In 1953 there was a proposal stating that this school district should be merged into the Spokane School District; C.B. McFadden, the superintendent of the Moses Lake district, supported the proposal.

The school district, in the 1980s, had bilingual classes for Japanese national children living in the area. They came because Japan Airlines did its pilot training at Grant County International Airport. Japanese Americans volunteered to tutor for these classes.

Monty Sabin became the superintendent in 2022.

In 2024 the district had a deficit of $20,000,000. The district's accounting had also mistakenly stated that the district had $11,000,000 more than it actually had. Sabin was in favor of a proposal to have a levy to make up the money. Referendums were organized. In February and in April of that year, 49% and 45% of voters were in favor. The levies did not go into effect as over 50% was needed to pass them.

In May 2024, as a result of the budget issues, the district decided to lay off around 100 employees, including teachers. Joel Martin of the Columbia Basin Herald stated that there were "more layoffs and program cuts expected". At the same time, the board of trustees then put Sabin on administrative leave. The board of trustees did not say why it chose to put Sabin on leave. Carol Lewis became acting superintendent at that time.

As of 2024 Carol Lewis is the superintendent. She was initially an interim superintendent but became the permanent superintendent.

== Schools ==
High schools:

- Moses Lake High School
- CBTECH Skills Center
- Digital Learning Center
- Open Doors
- Vanguard Academy

Middle schools:

- Columbia Middle School
- Endeavor Middle School
- Frontier Middle School

Elementary schools:

- Garden Heights Elementary School
- Groff Elementary School
- Knolls Vista Elementary School
- Lakeview Terrace Elementary School
- Larson Heights Elementary School
- Longview Elementary School
- Midway Elementary School
- North Elementary School
- Park Orchard Elementary School
- Peninsula Elementary School
- Sage Point Elementary School

Preschool:

- Early Learning Preschool

== See also ==
- 1996 Frontier Middle School shooting
