= Wheeler, Washington =

- Census-designated place
- Location within Washington (state) Location within the United States
- Coordinates: 47°08′06″N 119°10′34″W
- Country: United States
- State: Washington
- County: Grant

Area
  - Total: 0.22 sq mi (0.57 km^{2})
  - Land: 0.22 sq mi (0.57 km^{2})
  - Water: 0 sq mi (0.0 km^{2})
- Elevation: 1,263 ft (385 m)

Population (2020)
  - Total: 74
- Time zone: UTC-8 (Pacific (PST))
  - Summer (DST): UTC-7 (PDT)
- ZIP Code: 98837 (Moses Lake)
- Area code: 509
- FIPS code: 53-78050
- GNIS feature ID: 2807185

Wheeler is an unincorporated community and census-designated place (CDP) in Grant County, Washington, United States. As of the 2020 census, it had a population of 74.

The CDP is in the eastern part of the county, 5 miles (8 km) east of the center of Moses Lake. A spur of the BNSF Railway runs through Wheeler, serving various industries to the west of the community.

== Education ==
The area is served by the Moses Lake School District. Moses Lake High School is the district's sole comprehensive high school.

== Demographics ==
Historical population
Census	Pop.	Note	%±
2020	74		—
U.S. Decennial Census

Wheeler first appeared as a census designated place in the 2020 U.S. census.

=== Racial and ethnic composition ===
Wheeler CDP, Washington – Racial and ethnic composition Note: the US Census treats Hispanic/Latino as an ethnic category. This table excludes Latinos from the racial categories and assigns them to a separate category. Hispanics/Latinos may be of any race.
Race / Ethnicity (NH = Non-Hispanic)	Pop 2020	2020
White alone (NH)	31	41.89%
Black or African American alone (NH)	1	1.35%
Native American or Alaska Native alone (NH)	1	1.35%
Asian alone (NH)	0	0.00%
Native Hawaiian or Pacific Islander alone (NH)	0	0.00%
Other race alone (NH)	1	1.35%
Mixed race or Multiracial (NH)	3	4.05%
Hispanic or Latino (any race)	37	50.00%
Total	74	100.00%
