= Monument Hill =

Monument Hill may refer to:

- Monument Hill (Colorado), a mountain pass in Colorado, in the United States
- Monument Hill (Washington), a hill in Eastern Washington, in the United States
- Monument Hill and Kreische Brewery State Historic Sites, a state park in Texas, in the United States
- Monument Hill, a site at Organ Pipe Cactus National Monument, Arizona

== See also ==
- Monument Hills, California
