= Grant County International Airport =

Airport in Moses Lake, Washington state

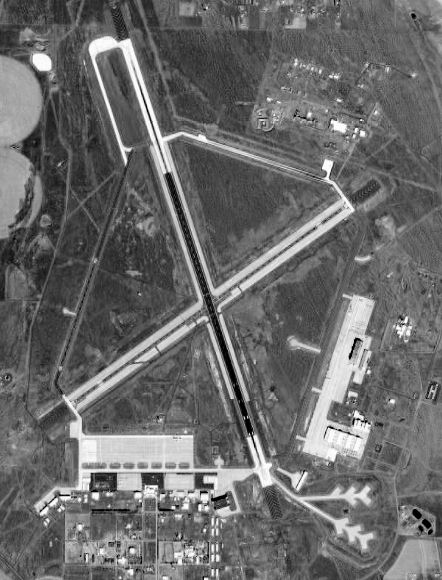
- USGS 1996 orthophoto
- IATA: MWH; ICAO: KMWH; FAA LID: MWH

Summary
- Airport type: Public
- Owner: Port of Moses Lake
- Serves: Grant County, Washington (Primarily Moses Lake)
- Location: Moses Lake North, Washington
- Elevation AMSL: 1,189 ft (362 m)
- Coordinates: 47°12′31″N 119°19′09″W
- Website: PortOfMosesLake.com

Map
- Location of airport in Washington MWH (the United States)

Runways
Direction	Length		Surface
Direction	ft	m	Surface
14L/32R	13,503	4,116	Asphalt/Concrete
4/22	10,000	3,048	Asphalt/Concrete
9/27	3,500	1,067	Concrete
18/36	3,327	1,014	Asphalt
14R/32L	2,936	895	Concrete

Statistics (2018)
- Aircraft operations: 77,335
- Based aircraft: 51
- Source: Federal Aviation Administration

Grant County International Airport (IATA: MWH, ICAO: KMWH, FAA LID: MWH) is a public use airport located in Moses Lake North in Grant County, Washington, United States, six miles (10 km) northwest of the central business district of Moses Lake. Formerly a military facility, the airport is owned by the Port of Moses Lake, and its 13,500-foot (4,110 m) runway is the 17th longest in the U.S.

According to Federal Aviation Administration records, the airport had 1,369 passenger boardings (enplanements) in calendar year 2008, 2,920 enplanements in 2009, and 1,442 in 2010. It is included in the National Plan of Integrated Airport Systems for 2011–2015, which categorized it as a general aviation airport.

== History ==
Opened as a training airfield during World War II, the facility was operated by the U.S. Air Force as Larson Air Force Base until 1966.

In September 2019, Boeing stored 100 of its undelivered 737 MAX airplanes at the Moses Lake airport while it awaited clearance from the FAA and other aviation regulators to return the jet to commercial service.

Passenger air service to and from Moses Lake ended on 8 June 2010.

== Accidents ==
On 24 June 1969, Japan Airlines Flight 90, a Convair 880, crashed on take-off from runway 32R at Grant County International Airport. The power was reduced on the number four engine during take-off, and the aircraft continued to yaw to the right until the number four engine struck and slid off the runway. It burst into flames, killing three of the five crew members on board. The probable cause was a "delayed corrective action during a simulated critical-engine-out takeoff maneuver resulting in an excessive sideslip from which full recovery could not be effected."

== Overview ==
With 4,650 acres (7.3 sq mi; 18.8 km^{2}) and a 13,500-foot (4,110 m) main runway, it is one of the largest airports in the United States. Moses Lake is famous for good flying weather, as it is located on the east side of the Cascade Range, in the semi-arid desert of central Washington.

Grant County International Airport was an alternate landing site for the NASA Space Shuttle.

Scheduled passenger flights on Big Sky Airlines to Boise and Portland were discontinued on September 1, 2006. The service was subsidized by the Essential Air Service program. United Express, operated by SkyWest Airlines offered nonstop flights to Seattle from June 2009 until June 2010. The airport currently has no commercial passenger air service.

The airport was used for heavy jet training by Japan Airlines (JAL) for over forty years, until the closing of their training offices in March 2009. The airport also had been used for flight testing of the Mitsubishi SpaceJet.

In November 1974, the airport hosted a new Supersonic Transport (SST) Concorde for a month during FAA certification testing.

It is also utilized by the U.S. Air Force and Boeing as a testing facility. Most of the traffic at the airport is general and military aviation.

In 2011, the 92nd Air Refueling Wing at Fairchild AFB in Spokane temporarily moved its KC-135 R/T fleet and operations to Moses Lake while Fairchild's runway underwent reconstruction and other infrastructure improvements, to include an upgrade to the base's aviation fuel distribution system.

The main campus for Big Bend Community College is also located on the grounds of the airport.

After the grounding of all Boeing 737 MAXs from March 2019, approximately 50 of the grounded airplanes were parked at the airport. This was originally seen as an economic opportunity for the airport, but later caused concern as the number of planes stored kept increasing, to approximately 130 by October 2019.

== Facilities and aircraft ==
FAA diagram

Grant Co. International Airport covers an area of 4,650 acres (1,880 ha) at an elevation of 1,189 feet (362 m) above sea level. It has five runways:

- Runway 14L/32R is 13,503 by 200 feet (4,116 by 61 m), with an asphalt/concrete surface
- Runway 4/22 is 10,000 by 100 feet (3,048 by 30 m), with an asphalt/concrete surface
- Runway 9/27 is 3,500 by 90 feet (1,067 by 27 m), with a concrete surface
- Runway 18/36 is 3,327 by 75 feet (1,014 by 23 m), with an asphalt surface
- Runway 14R/32L is 2,936 by 75 feet (895 by 23 m), with a concrete surface

For the 12-month period ending December 31, 2018, the airport had 77,335 aircraft operations, an average of 212 per day: 61% general aviation, 15% military, 10% air carrier and 14% air taxi. At that time there were 49 fixed-wing aircraft and 2 gliders based at this airport: 84% single-engine, 12% multi-engine, and 4% glider.

== Cargo carriers ==
Airlines	Destinations
Ameriflight	Burlington/Mount Vernon, Seattle–Boeing
FedEx Feeder	Spokane

== See also ==
- Washington World War II Army Airfields
- List of airports in Washington
- List of longest runways

== Other sources ==
- Essential Air Service documents (Docket OST-1998-3344) from the U.S. Department of Transportation:
  - Order 2001-6-22 (June 28, 2001): selecting Big Sky Airlines, to provide essential air service at Ephrata/Moses Lake, Washington, for a two-year period at an annual subsidy of $479,702.
  - Order 2004-12-18 (December 30, 2004): selecting Big Sky Transportation Company, Inc., to continue providing essential air service (EAS) at Ephrata/Moses Lake, Washington, for a new two-year period. This order establishes a subsidy of $1,698,922 per year for service consisting of twelve nonstop round trips to Portland and six nonstop round trip to Boise each week.
  - Order 2006-6-8 (June 12, 2006): directing interested persons to show cause why the department should not terminate the subsidy eligibility of Ephrata/Moses Lake, Washington, under the essential air service (EAS) program and allow Big Sky Transportation Company, Inc., d/b/a Big Sky Airlines (Big Sky) to suspend service there as of August 1, 2006.
  - Order 2006-8-16 (August 22, 2006): terminating the subsidy eligibility of Ephrata/Moses Lake, Washington, under the essential air service (EAS) program and allowing Big Sky Transportation Company, Inc., d.b.a. Big Sky Airlines to suspend service, if it chooses.
