= Mae, Washington =

Unincorporated community in Washington, US

- Unincorporated community
- Location within Washington (state) Location within the United States
- Coordinates: 47°07′03″N 119°23′44″W
- Country: United States
- State: Washington
- County: Grant
- Established: 1906
- Elevation: 1,116 ft (340 m)
- Time zone: UTC-8 (Pacific (PST))
  - Summer (DST): UTC-7 (PDT)
- Area code: 509
- GNIS feature ID: 1511115

Mae is an unincorporated community in Grant County, in the U.S. state of Washington.

== History ==
A post office called Mae was established in 1906, and remained in operation until 1955. Mae Shoemaker, an early postmaster, gave the community her name.

Mae, along with the parts of Moses Lake, Washington located west of Moses Lake are together referred to as Mae Valley.
