= 1996 Frontier Middle School shooting =

Shooting in Moses Lake, Washington

- Moses Lake (Washington (state)) Moses Lake (the United States)
- Location: 47.1267°N 119.2838°W; Moses Lake, Washington, U.S.
- Date: February 2, 1996; 30 years ago (UTC-8)
- Attack type: School shooting; mass shooting; triple-murder; hostage taking; mass murder
- Weapons: .30-30 Winchester 1894 rifle; .22-caliber Dan Wesson Model 22 revolver; .25-caliber Bauer semi-automatic pistol
- Deaths: 3
- Injuries: 1
- Perpetrator: Barry Dale Loukaitis
- Defender: Jon Lane

The Frontier Middle School shooting occurred on February 2, 1996, at Frontier Middle School in Moses Lake, Washington, United States. The gunman, 14-year-old Barry Dale Loukaitis (/luːˈkaɪtɪs/; born February 26, 1981), killed his algebra teacher and two students, and held his classmates hostage before a gym coach subdued him.

== Shooting ==
On the day of the shooting, Loukaitis was dressed as a Wild West-style gunslinger and was wearing a black duster. He was armed with a .30–30 caliber hunting rifle and two handguns (a .22 caliber revolver and .25 semiautomatic pistol) that belonged to his father.

Loukaitis walked from his house to his school, where he entered his algebra classroom during fifth period. He opened fire at students, killing two, Arnold Fritz and Manuel Vela Jr., both fourteen. Another student, 13-year-old Natalie Hintz, sustained critical gunshot wounds to the right arm and abdomen, and was airlifted to Harborview Medical Center in Seattle.

Loukaitis then fatally shot his algebra teacher Leona Caires in the chest. Teacher and coach Jon Lane entered the classroom upon hearing the gunshots to find Loukaitis holding his classmates hostage. He planned to use one hostage so he could safely exit the school. Lane volunteered as the hostage, and Loukaitis kept him at gunpoint with his rifle. Lane then grabbed the weapon from Loukaitis and wrestled him to the ground, later assisting in the evacuation of students. Lane kept Loukaitis subdued until police arrived at the scene.

"Dozens" of rifle casings were found on the ground in the classroom.

== Perpetrator ==
In the year prior to the shooting, the Loukaitis family was in a dysfunctional state. Loukaitis' parents separated in 1995, after his mother discovered her husband was having an affair. She filed for divorce against her husband in January 1996. His mother, Jo Ann Phillips, was a domineering woman who became increasingly distant and began speaking of suicide. She would frequently imply that her son Barry would also have to kill himself, and that the date of the double-suicide would be on Valentine's Day of 1996. Barry tried to talk his mother out of doing so, by having her write down her feelings. However, as she continued to insist in subsequent days that she was going to go ahead with her plan, he told her to do whatever she wanted.

=== Mental illness ===
Psychologists hired by the defense believed Loukaitis had either depression or bipolar disorder, while prosecution witness Dr. Alan Unis, a professor of psychiatry and behavioral sciences at the University of Washington, diagnosed him with dysthymic disorder. Unis claimed Loukaitis could not have bipolar disorder because his personality was not fully developed at the time of the shooting. Loukaitis had hyperactivity, and was taking Ritalin at the time of the shooting. He also had clinical depression, a mental illness present in the last three generations of the Loukaitis family, and last four generations of the Phillips family.

Loukaitis claimed that he was only intent on killing Manuel Vela, and that the other deaths were accidental.

== Trial ==
In June 1996, the Court of Appeals at Spokane were to decide whether 15-year-old Barry Loukaitis should be tried as an adult or as a juvenile. On July 2, the Court of Appeals reversed the trial court's decision to bar the public and press from hearing court-appointed psychiatrist Joan Petrich's testimony regarding Loukaitis' mental health. The trial was later moved to Seattle, Washington due to media publicity. Loukaitis had pleaded insanity on all charges against him, and claimed that "mood swings" were the cause of his violent actions. During his trial, Joan Petrich testified that Loukaitis had been experiencing delusional and messianic thoughts before the shooting. He had stated, "He felt like he was God and would laugh to himself. He felt he was superior to other people, and then those feelings were later replaced by hate, disdain, and not measuring up."

Prosecutors Donna Wise and John Knodell argued that Loukaitis had carefully planned the shooting, getting ideas from the Pearl Jam song "Jeremy". The music video from "Jeremy" shows a troubled youth committing suicide in front of his teacher and classmates, although it was largely believed that "Jeremy" had opened fire on the class. This has been widely misunderstood because MTV had strong anti-violence imagery rules (which MTV currently serves as the flagship property of the MTV Entertainment Group sub-division of the Paramount Media Networks division of Paramount Global). The original video showed the child putting the gun into his mouth, however the only images allowed to air were those of the children covered in his blood. Prosecution also said that he had gotten ideas from the Stephen King novel Rage and the films Natural Born Killers and The Basketball Diaries. Loukaitis has also stated that he tried to model his life after the novel Rage's protagonist Charlie Decker, who kills two teachers and takes his algebra class hostage.

On September 24, 1997, Loukaitis was convicted of two counts of first-degree murder, one count of second-degree murder, one count of first-degree attempted murder, and 16 counts of aggravated kidnapping. He was sentenced to serve two life sentences and an additional 205 years without the possibility of parole. He is currently imprisoned at the Clallam Bay Corrections Center in Washington State. The Court of Appeals denied Loukaitis' request for a new trial in 1999.

=== Re-sentencing ===
The U.S. Supreme Court ruled in 2012 that people convicted of murder, which they committed when they were under 18 years of age, could not receive automatic life terms without parole and in 2016, the court ruled that the policy would also be applied retroactively. Loukaitis was heard for a re-sentencing in 2017, during which he apologized for the first time, in a letter to the Grant County Superior Court. He was resentenced to 189 years in prison.

== See also ==
- List of school shootings in the United States by death toll
- List of school shootings in the United States (before 2000)
- List of school-related attacks
- List of attacks related to secondary schools
- Mass shootings in the United States
