= Wild Horse Wind Farm =

Power generation site in Washington, US

Coordinates: 47°01′07″N 120°12′58″W

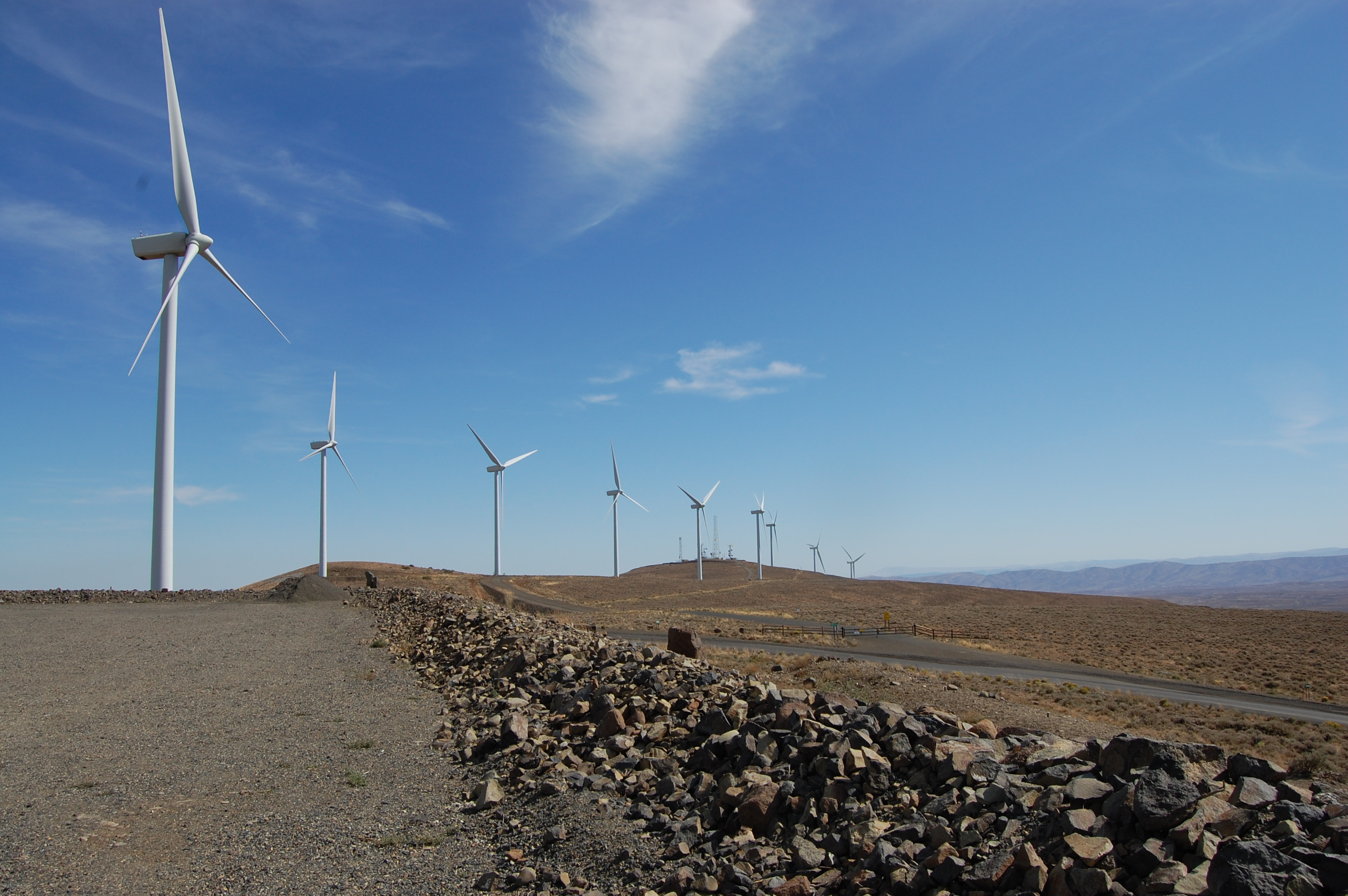
Turbines at Wild Horse

The Wild Horse Wind Farm is a 273-megawatt wind farm that generates energy for Puget Sound Energy that consists of one hundred twenty seven 1.8-megawatt Vestas V80 turbines and twenty two 2.0-megawatt Vestas V80 turbines on a 10,800-acre (4,400 ha) site in Kittitas County, Washington, 17 miles (27 km) east of Ellensburg, Washington. The turbines are placed on the high open Shrub-steppe ridge tops of Whiskey Dick Mountain, which was chosen for its energetic wind resource, remote location, and access to nearby power transmission lines. The towers are 221 feet (67 m) tall, and each blade is 129 feet (39 m) long, with a total rotor diameter of 264 feet (80 m), larger than the wingspan of a Boeing 747. The turbines can begin producing electricity with wind speeds as low as 9 mph (14 km/h) and reach full production at 31 mph (50 km/h). They shut down at sustained wind speeds of 56 mph (90 km/h). The site is also home to one of the largest solar array (500 kW) in Washington.

The wind farm was developed by Horizon Wind (formerly owned by Goldman Sachs, later sold to EDP) EDP Renewables, a subsidiary of Energias de Portugal S.A. (EDP), a Portuguese utility company and built by Puget Sound Energy (PSE), an electric and gas distribution utility in the State of Washington. Construction began in October 2005 and was completed in December 2006. An expansion was completed in 2009.

The Wild Horse Wind Farm also has a visitor center called the Renewable Energy Center, with guided tours of a Silicon Energy Solar array, a 1.8 MW wind turbine generator, a wind turbine blade, and includes a look inside the base of a wind turbine.

== See also ==
- Wind farm
- Wind power in the United States
