= Big Bend Community College =

Public community college in Moses Lake, Washington, US

Coordinates: 47°11′07″N 119°19′42″W

- Motto: Transforming Lives Through Excellence in Teaching and Learning.
- Type: Public community college
- Established: 1962; 64 years ago
- Affiliations: Northwest Athletic Conference (NWAC)
- President: Sara Thompson Tweedy
- Students: 1,755 (Fall 2021)
- Location: Moses Lake North, Washington, United States
- Campus: Rural
- Colors: Navy Blue & Dark Green
- Nickname: Vikings
- Mascot: Viking
- Website: www.bigbend.edu

Big Bend Community College (BBCC) is a public community college in Moses Lake North, Washington, with a Moses Lake postal address. It was established in 1961 and moved to its campus at the former Larson Air Force Base in 1966.

== History ==
Big Bend Community College was authorized by the Washington State Board of Education in 1961. On September 12, 1962, BBCC held its first regular classes at night in Moses Lake High School; the opening of a permanent facility was delayed by a steelworkers' strike. The college opened classes in a new facility located a short distance southeast of the city of Moses Lake in late 1963. In 1966, BBCC acquired a 159-acre (0.64 km^{2}) tract of land on the former Larson Air Force Base from the federal government at no cost. It was designated as the college's north campus with some classes remaining at the existing south campus. The north campus absorbed all classes and programs in 1975.

The Washington State Legislature's Community College Act of 1967 designated BBCC as District 18 of the state community college system. The 4,600-square-mile (12,000 km^{2}) district includes Grant and Adams counties and the Odessa School district in Lincoln County.

== Campus ==
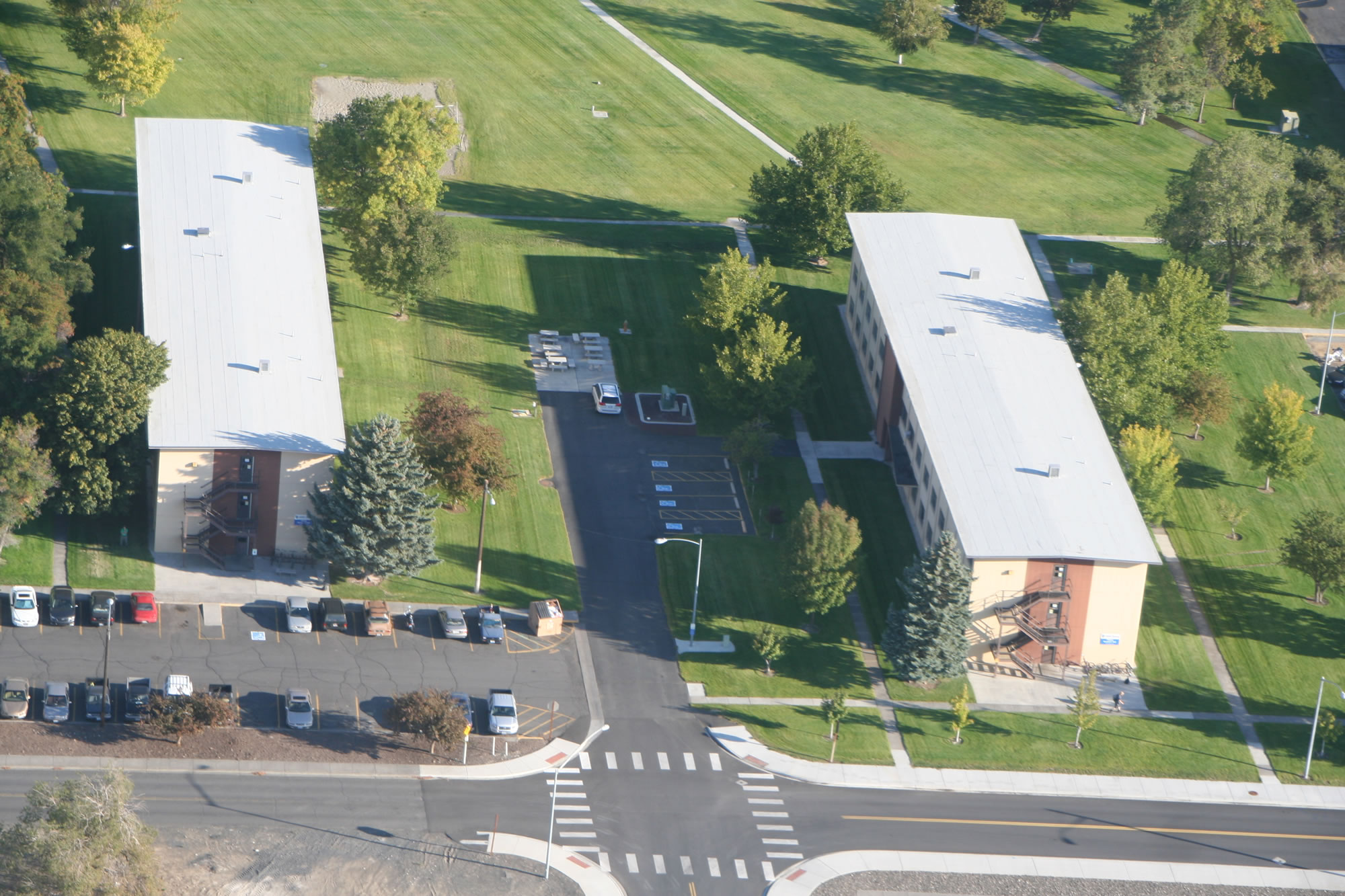
Dormitory buildings at Big Bend Community College

Big Bend Community College's main campus is centrally located in the Columbia Basin of Washington state. The campus includes 25 buildings to facilitate more than 43 academic program areas.

== Accreditation ==
Big Bend Community College is accredited by the Northwest Commission on Colleges and Universities. Its transfer credits are normally accepted by other accredited colleges.

== Athletics ==
Big Bend Community College competes in the Northwest Athletic Conference (NWAC) as the Vikings, fielding men's teams for baseball, basketball, and wrestling. Women's teams for softball, basketball, volleyball, and wrestling.

== Programs ==
Circa 1966 the college began an education program for Japanese farmers, teaching them American farming methods. In 1974 the college started sponsorship of the Japanese Agricultural Training Program.

== Notable people ==
- Nilsa Cruz-Perez, member of the New Jersey Senate
- Tom Dent, member of the Washington House of Representatives
- Margie Gannon, member of the Idaho House of Representatives
