= Trinidad, Washington =

Ghost town in Washington (state)

- Unincorporated community, Ghost town
- Location within Washington (state) Location within the United States
- Coordinates: 47°13′47″N 120°00′02″W
- Country: United States
- State: Washington
- County: Grant
- Elevation: 929 ft (283 m)
- Time zone: UTC-8 (Pacific (PST))
  - Summer (DST): UTC-7 (PDT)
- GNIS feature ID: 1511377

Trinidad is an unincorporated community and ghost town in Grant County, Washington. The town is located between Quincy and Wenatchee atop a ridge overlooking the Columbia River. At an elevation of 928 feet (283 m), Trinidad appears on both the Babcock Ridge and West Bar United States Geological Survey maps.

Trinidad was originally a railroad stop and was named by workers for the Great Northern Railway due to its geological and physical similarity to Trinidad, Colorado. Trinidad is located on the border with Douglas County, directly above the Crescent Bar Resort on the Columbia River. Though previously a ghost town, Trinidad has become a more popular location for new residential structures.
