= Sunland Estates, Washington =

- Census-designated place
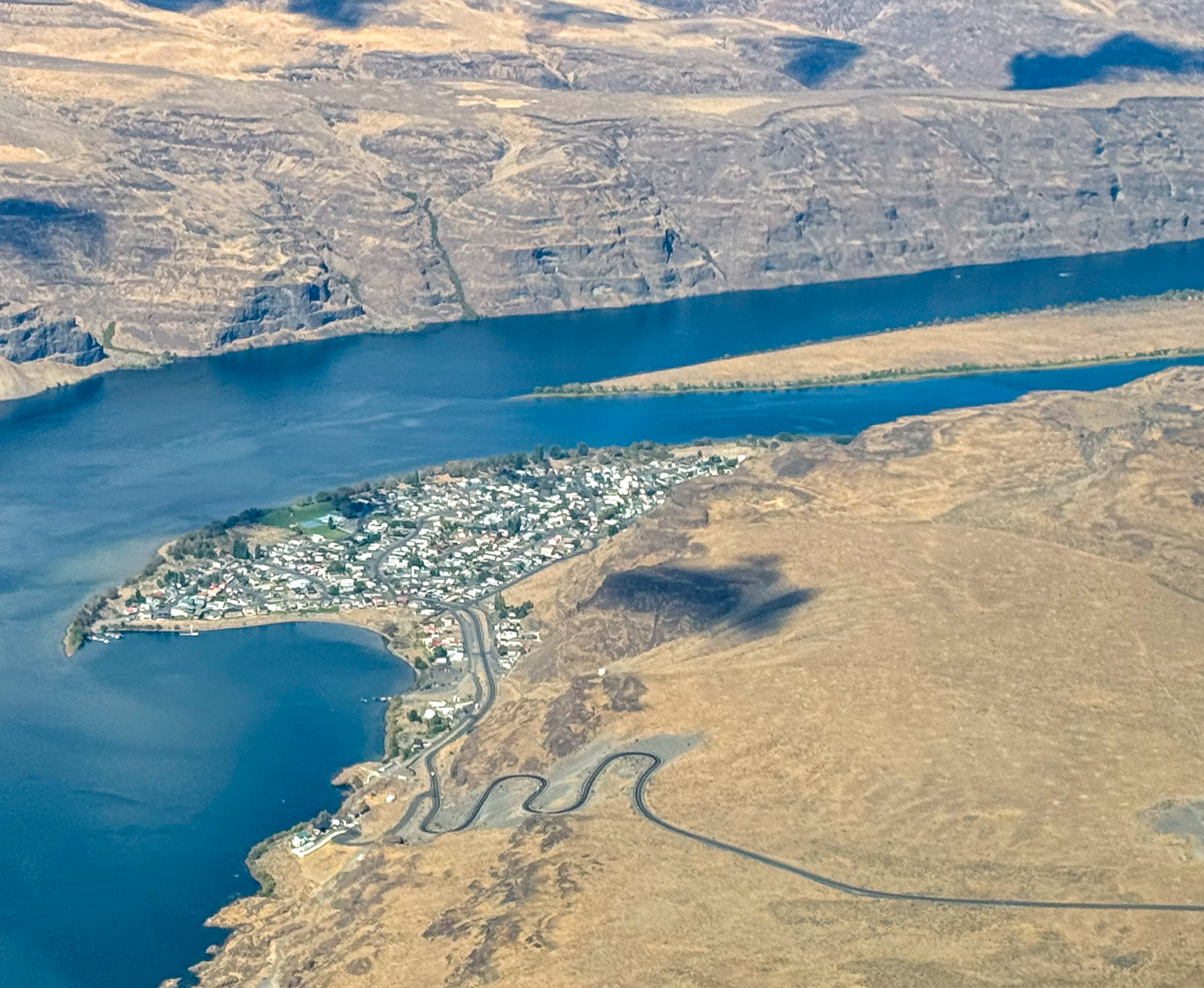

- Location within Washington (state) Location within the United States
- Coordinates: 47°04′27″N 120°01′42″W
- Country: United States
- State: Washington
- County: Grant

Area
  - Total: 0.40 sq mi (1.04 km^{2})
  - Land: 0.40 sq mi (1.04 km^{2})
  - Water: 0 sq mi (0.0 km^{2})
- Elevation: 630 ft (190 m)

Population (2020)
  - Total: 179
- Time zone: UTC-8 (Pacific (PST))
  - Summer (DST): UTC-7 (PDT)
- ZIP Code: 98848 (Quincy)
- Area code: 509
- FIPS code: 53-68557
- GNIS feature ID: 2807184

Sunland Estates is an unincorporated community and census-designated place (CDP) in Grant County, Washington, United States. As of the 2020 census, it had a population of 179.

The CDP is on the western edge of the county, on the east bank of the Columbia River. It is 12 miles (19 km) west of Interstate 90 at George and 20 miles (32 km) southwest of Quincy.

== Education ==
The area is served by the Quincy School District.

== Demographics ==
Historical population
| Census | Pop. | Note | %± |
|---|---|---|---|
| 2020 | 179 | | — |
U.S. Decennial Census

Sunland Estates first appeared as a census designated place in the 2020 U.S. census.

=== Racial and ethnic composition ===
Sunland Estates CDP, Washington – Racial and ethnic composition Note: the US Census treats Hispanic/Latino as an ethnic category. This table excludes Latinos from the racial categories and assigns them to a separate category. Hispanics/Latinos may be of any race.
| Race / Ethnicity (NH = Non-Hispanic) | Pop 2020 | 2020 |
|---|---|---|
| White alone (NH) | 148 | 82.68% |
| Black or African American alone (NH) | 1 | 0.56% |
| Native American or Alaska Native alone (NH) | 1 | 0.56% |
| Asian alone (NH) | 2 | 1.12% |
| Native Hawaiian or Pacific Islander alone (NH) | 0 | 0.00% |
| Other race alone (NH) | 1 | 0.56% |
| Mixed race or Multiracial (NH) | 5 | 2.79% |
| Hispanic or Latino (any race) | 21 | 11.73% |
| Total | 179 | 100.00% |
