= Banks Lake South, Washington =

- Census-designated place
- Location of Banks Lake South in Washington
- Coordinates: 47°37′56″N 119°16′34″W
- Country: United States
- State: Washington
- County: Grant

Area
  - Total: 2.9 sq mi (7.5 km^{2})
  - Land: 2.4 sq mi (6.3 km^{2})
  - Water: 0.46 sq mi (1.2 km^{2})
- Elevation: 1,624 ft (495 m)

Population (2020)
  - Total: 234
  - Density: 96/sq mi (37/km^{2})
- Time zone: UTC-8 (Pacific (PST))
  - Summer (DST): UTC-7 (PDT)
- ZIP code: 99115
- Area code: 509
- FIPS code: 53-04125
- GNIS feature ID: 1852937

Banks Lake South is a census-designated place (CDP) in Grant County, Washington, United States. The population was 234 at the 2020 census.

== Geography ==
Banks Lake South is located in northern Grant County adjacent to the eastern border of Coulee City. It is on the east side of Banks Lake near its southern end, part of the Upper Grand Coulee valley.

U.S. Route 2 passes through the CDP, leading east 30 miles (48 km) to Wilbur and west 68 miles (109 km) to Wenatchee. Spokane is 94 miles (151 km) to the east via US 2. Washington State Route 155 leads northeast from Banks Lake 25 miles (40 km) to the city of Grand Coulee near the Grand Coulee Dam.

According to the United States Census Bureau, the Banks Lake South CDP has a total area of 2.9 square miles (7.5 km^{2}), of which 2.4 square miles (6.3 km^{2}) are land and 0.46 square miles (1.2 km^{2}), or 16.06%, are water.

== Demographics ==
Historical population
Census	Pop.	Note	%±
2000	160		—
2010	174		8.8%
2020	234		34.5%
U.S. Decennial Census; 1990 2000 2010

Banks Lake South first appeared as a census designated place in the 2000 U.S. census.

=== Racial and ethnic composition ===
Banks Lake South CDP, Washington – Racial and ethnic composition Note: the US Census treats Hispanic/Latino as an ethnic category. This table excludes Latinos from the racial categories and assigns them to a separate category. Hispanics/Latinos may be of any race.
Race / Ethnicity (NH = Non-Hispanic)	Pop 2000	Pop 2010	Pop 2020	% 2000	% 2010	% 2020
White alone (NH)	159	167	208	99.38%	95.98%	88.89%
Black or African American alone (NH)	0	0	2	0.00%	0.00%	0.85%
Native American or Alaska Native alone (NH)	0	4	3	0.00%	2.30%	1.28%
Asian alone (NH)	0	0	1	0.00%	0.00%	0.43%
Native Hawaiian or Pacific Islander alone (NH)	0	0	0	0.00%	0.00%	0.00%
Other race alone (NH)	0	0	0	0.00%	0.00%	0.00%
Mixed race or Multiracial (NH)	1	3	7	0.63%	1.72%	2.99%
Hispanic or Latino (any race)	0	0	13	0.00%	0.00%	5.56%
Total	160	174	234	100.00%	100.00%	100.00%

=== 2000 census ===
As of the census of 2000, there were 160 people, 75 households, and 53 families residing in the CDP. The population density was 65.7 people per square mile (25.3/km^{2}). There were 86 housing units at an average density of 35.3/sq mi (13.6/km^{2}). The racial makeup of the CDP was 99.38% White, and 0.62% from two or more races.

There were 75 households, out of which 21.3% had children under the age of 18 living with them, 65.3% were married couples living together, 4.0% had a female householder with no husband present, and 29.3% were non-families. 26.7% of all households were made up of individuals, and 6.7% had someone living alone who was 65 years of age or older. The average household size was 2.13 and the average family size was 2.57.

In the CDP, the age distribution of the population shows 16.3% under the age of 18, 4.4% from 18 to 24, 18.8% from 25 to 44, 41.9% from 45 to 64, and 18.8% who were 65 years of age or older. The median age was 53 years. For every 100 females, there were 105.1 males. For every 100 females age 18 and over, there were 103.0 males.

The median income for a household in the CDP was $37,500, and the median income for a family was $38,750. Males had a median income of $34,375 versus $28,750 for females. The per capita income for the CDP was $18,588. About 4.3% of families and 8.7% of the population were below the poverty line, including 14.3% of those under the age of eighteen and 8.8% of those 65 or over.

== Education ==
The area is served by the Coulee-Hartline School District.
