= Stratford, Washington =

Unincorporated community in Washington, United States

- Unincorporated community
- Location within Washington (state) Location within the United States
- Coordinates: 47°25′36″N 119°16′54″W
- Country: United States
- State: Washington
- County: Grant
- Elevation: 1,263 ft (385 m)
- Time zone: UTC-8 (Pacific (PST))
  - Summer (DST): UTC-7 (PDT)
- ZIP code: 98853
- Area code: 509
- GNIS feature ID: 1511341

Stratford is an unincorporated community in Grant County, Washington, United States. Stratford is 11.1 miles (17.9 km) east-northeast of Soap Lake. Stratford has a post office with ZIP code 98853.
