= Crescent Bar, Washington =

- Census-designated place
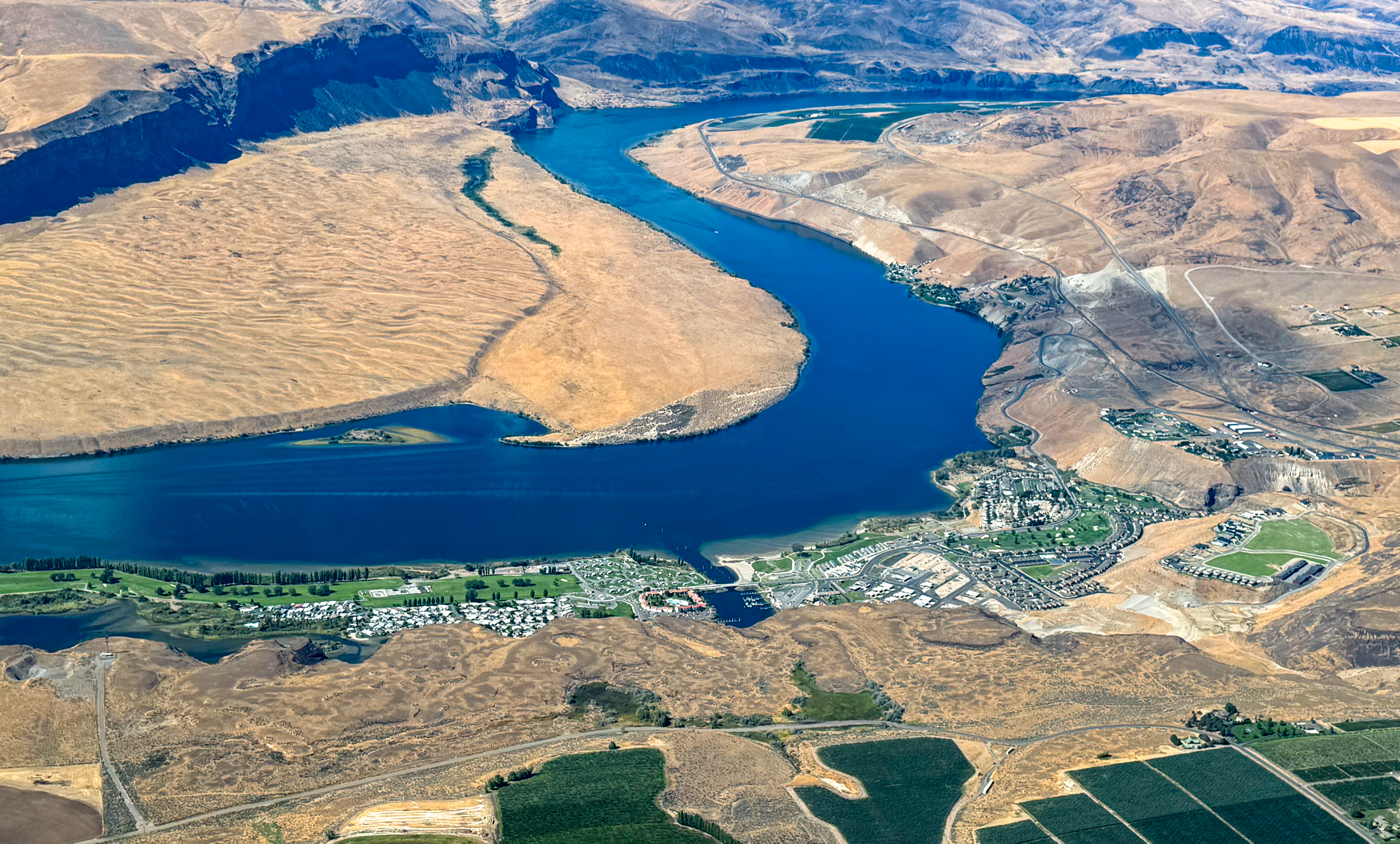

- Location within Washington (state) Location within the United States
- Coordinates: 47°12′30″N 119°59′58″W
- Country: United States
- State: Washington
- County: Grant

Area
  - Total: 1.88 sq mi (4.88 km^{2})
  - Land: 1.01 sq mi (2.61 km^{2})
  - Water: 0.88 sq mi (2.27 km^{2})
- Elevation: 584 ft (178 m)

Population (2020)
  - Total: 325
- Time zone: UTC-8 (Pacific (PST))
  - Summer (DST): UTC-7 (PDT)
- ZIP Code: 98848 (Quincy)
- Area code: 509
- FIPS code: 53-15603
- GNIS feature ID: 2807179

Crescent Bar is a resort area and census-designated place (CDP) in Grant County, Washington, United States. As of the 2020 census, it had a population of 325.

The CDP is on the western edge of the county, on the east side of the Columbia River. A portion of the community occupies an island (Crescent Bar) in the river. The community is 2 miles (3 km) south of Washington State Route 28 at Trinidad. SR 28 leads east 7 miles (11 km) to Quincy and northwest 24 miles (39 km) to Wenatchee.

== Education ==
The area is served by the Quincy School District.

== Demographics ==
Historical population
Census	Pop.	Note	%±
2020	325		—
U.S. Decennial Census

Crescent Bar first appeared as a census designated place in the 2020 U.S. census.

=== Racial and ethnic composition ===
Crescent Bar CDP, Washington – Racial and ethnic composition Note: the US Census treats Hispanic/Latino as an ethnic category. This table excludes Latinos from the racial categories and assigns them to a separate category. Hispanics/Latinos may be of any race.
Race / Ethnicity (NH = Non-Hispanic)	Pop 2020	2020
White alone (NH)	289	88.92%
Black or African American alone (NH)	0	0.00%
Native American or Alaska Native alone (NH)	2	0.62%
Asian alone (NH)	3	0.92%
Native Hawaiian or Pacific Islander alone (NH)	0	0.00%
Other race alone (NH)	0	0.00%
Mixed race or Multiracial (NH)	10	3.08%
Hispanic or Latino (any race)	21	6.46%
Total	325	100.00%
