= Monument Hill (Washington) =

Mountain in Washington (state), United States

- Location within Washington (state)

Highest point
- Elevation: 879.7 m (2,886 ft) NAVD 88
- Prominence: 292 ft (89 m)
- Coordinates: 47°19′13″N 119°48′04″W

Geography
- Location: Grant County, Washington, U.S.
- Parent range: Beezley Hills
- Topo map: USGS Monument Hill

Monument Hill in the Beezley Hills is the second highest summit in Grant County, Washington at 2,882 feet (878 m) or 2,886 feet (879.7 m). Monument Hill Road runs nearly to the summit, and another road runs a few hundred meters to the antenna farm at the summit itself.

The antenna farm at the summit includes the KWWW-FM transmitter and KZML transmitter.
