= Ruff, Washington =

Unincorporated community in Washington, US

- Unincorporated community
- Location within Washington (state) Location within the United States
- Coordinates: 47°10′11″N 118°59′54″W
- Country: United States
- State: Washington
- County: Grant
- Platted: 1910
- Elevation: 1,365 ft (416 m)
- Time zone: UTC-8 (Pacific (PST))
  - Summer (DST): UTC-7 (PDT)
- Area code: 509
- GNIS feature ID: 1512627

Ruff is an unincorporated community in Grant County, in the U.S. state of Washington.

== History ==
Ruff was platted in 1910 when the railroad was extended to that point. The community was named in honor of Godfried Ruff, a German settler. A post office was established at Ruff in 1911, and remained in operation until 1954.
