= Columbia Basin Herald =

Newspaper based in Moses Lake, Washington, US

- Type: Daily newspaper
- Owner: Hagadone Newspapers
- Founder: G. D. Arnold
- Publisher: Clint Schroeder
- Managing editor: Rob Miller
- General manager: Bob Richardson
- Founded: 1941
- Language: English
- Headquarters: Moses Lake, Washington
- Circulation: 7,780 (as of 2022)
- ISSN: 1041-1658
- OCLC number: 18670398
- Website: columbiabasinherald.com

The Columbia Basin Herald is a daily newspaper based in Moses Lake, Washington, United States. The newspaper serves Central Washington and is the legal newspaper of record for Moses Lake, Royal City, and Grant County. It is owned by Hagadone News Network.

== History ==
G. D. Arnold, owner of the Grand Coulee News Times, discontinued the paper and moved his printing plant to Moses Lake, Washington to launch the Moses Lake Herald on July 31, 1941. Archie Trenner became publisher in April 1942. In 1946, Edward "Ned" Thomas, Archie Trenner and William G. Orthman purchased the Herald. In May 1947, the CBH was elected to membership in the Associated Press. In 1950, Ned Thomas became the sole-owner and Gilbert H. Kaynor, manager of the Ellensburg Record, joined him as co-owner in 1952.

The paper was originally a weekly, but expanded to a twice weekly in late 1953 and then five days a week in March 1955. At that time the paper was renamed to the Columbia Basin Daily Herald. Thomas and Kaynor sold their controlling interests in 1967 to Duane Hagadone, owner of Hagadone Newspapers, a division of Scripps League Newspapers. Hagadone ended their partnership with Scripps in 1976. He died in 2021.

== Awards ==
In March 1962, the Inland Empire Press-Radio-TV journalism awards were made in Spokane, WA, with the CBH earning a mention for reporter Elton Troth's articles about the Grant County PUD probe of the Priest Rapids dam, and for Ned Thomas' article about journalists meeting with President John F. Kennedy during his visit to Moses Lake. Ned Thomas subsequently moved from CBH to the Port Angeles Evening News in October 1967, where he assumed duties as editor and associate publisher. Thomas had been in Moses Lake for 21 years and earned numerous journalism awards. Elton Troth also departed Moses Lake in 1966 to work as an Information Officer for the Washington State Division of Vocational Rehabilitation in Olympia, Washington.

In May 1983, the CBH won 5 awards at the combined Region 10 and Inland Empire Society of Professional Journalists Sigma Delta Chi awards in Spokane. By comparison, the Spokane-based Spokesman-Review and Spokane Chronicle won 56 awards. The Chronicle had merged with the Spokesman-Review in January 1983.
