= Cascade Valley, Washington =

- Census-designated place
- Location of Cascade Valley, Washington
- Coordinates: 47°07′48″N 119°19′29″W
- Country: United States
- State: Washington
- County: Grant

Area
  - Total: 4.60 sq mi (11.92 km^{2})
  - Land: 2.97 sq mi (7.68 km^{2})
  - Water: 1.64 sq mi (4.24 km^{2})
- Elevation: 1,073 ft (327 m)

Population (2020)
  - Total: 4,332
  - Density: 1,460/sq mi (564/km^{2})
- Time zone: UTC-8 (Pacific (PST))
  - Summer (DST): UTC-7 (PDT)
- ZIP code: 98837
- Area code: 509
- FIPS code: 53-10455
- GNIS feature ID: 2407981

Cascade Valley is a census-designated place (CDP) in Grant County, Washington, United States. As of the 2020 census, Cascade Valley had a population of 4,332.

== Geography ==
Cascade Valley is located in eastern Grant County and is bordered to the east and south by the city of Moses Lake, and to the west by the water body of Moses Lake.

According to the United States Census Bureau, the CDP has a total area of 4.6 square miles (11.9 km^{2}), of which 3.0 square miles (7.7 km^{2}) are land and 1.6 square miles (4.2 km^{2}), or 35.62%, are water.

== Demographics ==
Historical population
Census	Pop.	Note	%±
U.S. Decennial Census; 1970 1980 1990; 2000 2010

As of the census of 2000, there were 1,811 people, 665 households, and 474 families residing in the CDP. The population density was 654.7 people per square mile (252.4/km^{2}). There were 759 housing units at an average density of 274.4/sq mi (105.8/km^{2}). The racial makeup of the CDP was 79.73% White, 2.87% African American, 1.44% Native American, 0.33% Asian, 0.06% Pacific Islander, 11.32% from other races, and 4.25% from two or more races. Hispanic or Latino of any race were 17.12% of the population.

There were 665 households, out of which 36.1% had children under the age of 18 living with them, 57.4% were married couples living together, 10.1% had a female householder with no husband present, and 28.6% were non-families. 22.6% of all households were made up of individuals, and 6.8% had someone living alone who was 65 years of age or older. The average household size was 2.72 and the average family size was 3.16.

In the CDP, the age distribution of the population shows 29.3% under the age of 18, 9.3% from 18 to 24, 30.3% from 25 to 44, 21.3% from 45 to 64, and 9.9% who were 65 years of age or older. The median age was 33 years. For every 100 females, there were 105.8 males. For every 100 females age 18 and over, there were 106.3 males.

The median income for a household in the CDP was $37,344, and the median income for a family was $41,250. Males had a median income of $35,179 versus $23,693 for females. The per capita income for the CDP was $16,170. About 13.5% of families and 15.0% of the population were below the poverty line, including 18.1% of those under age 18 and 2.1% of those age 65 or over.

== Education ==
The area is served by the Moses Lake School District. Moses Lake High School is the district's sole comprehensive high school.
