= Grant County Courthouse (Washington) =

- U.S. National Register of Historic Places
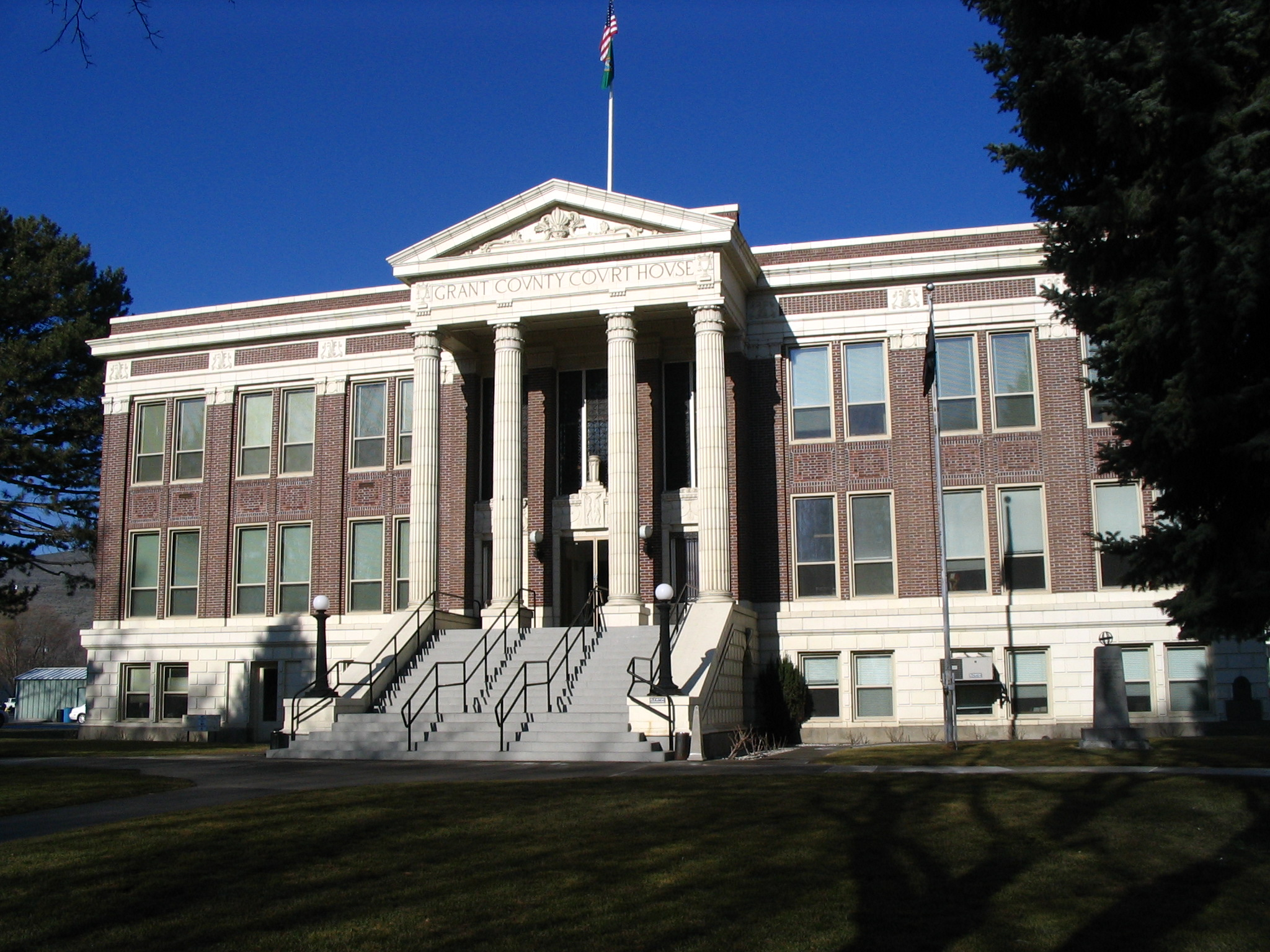

- Location within Washington (state) Location within the United States
- Interactive map showing the location of Grant County Courthouse
- Location: 35 C St. NW., Ephrata, Washington
- Coordinates: 47°19′18.64″N 119°33′12.16″W
- Area: 2 city blocks
- Built: 1917
- Architect: George Keith
- Architectural style: Classical Revival
- NRHP reference No.: 75001850
- Added to NRHP: September 5, 1975

The Grant County Courthouse building is located in Ephrata, Washington and is the Administrative Center of Government for Grant County. It was listed on the National Register of Historic Places in 1975.

== Construction ==
The original courthouse was a two-story, wood-framed 40-by-60-foot (12 m × 18 m) building, built shortly after Grant County was created in 1909. The wood building was constructed in 1909 (and the first courthouse of Grant County) by J. O. Cunningham of Wilson Creek for a bid of $4,975. The original courthouse, however, was of modest construction and quickly became outdated as Grant County grew, and due to the growth of the Grant County government, inadequate space for county personnel, the lack of archival storage, and safety concerns, a new courthouse building was necessary. The former courthouse was later transformed into a community Methodist church.

Construction of a new Grant County Courthouse began late July 1917 with the purchase of two city blocks in downtown Ephrata. With plans laid out by architect George Keith, the building was built in the classical revival style, with terra cotta, concrete, and brick exterior, with ornate columns and cornices. The cost of the Courthouse cost Grant County $63,263 total. On January 25, 1918, the new building was accepted by the Grant County Commissioners from the contractor and the local government moved into the building. County Clerk J. D. Steele was the first government official who occupied the new courthouse.

The courthouse is geothermally heated from a hot spring (actually a 305m deep well).

=== Renovation ===
In 2014, plans were made to renovate the aging building and restore it to its 1917 appearance by removing vinyl windows, restoring the front staircase, and upgrading the inefficient two-pipe building environmental system.
