= Whiskey Dick Mountain =

Mountain in Washington (state), United States

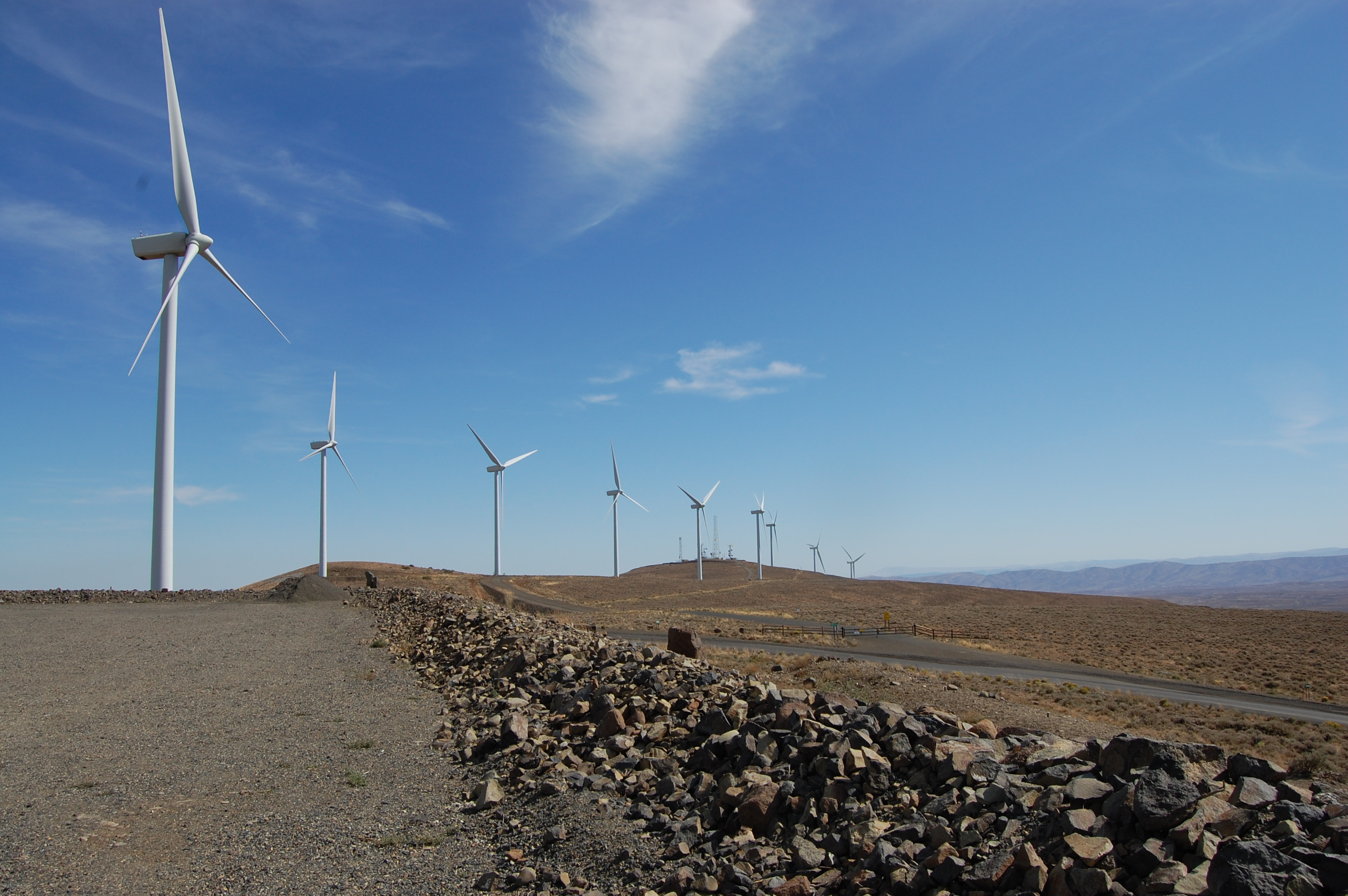
- Wind turbines on Whiskey Dick Mountain

Highest point
- Elevation: 3,873 ft (1,180 m) NGVD 29
- Prominence: 423 ft (129 m)
- Coordinates: 47°01′30″N 120°13′55″W

Geography
- Location within Washington (state)
- Location: Kittitas County, Washington, U.S.
- Parent range: Wenatchee Mountains
- Topo map: USGS Whiskey Dick Mountain

Climbing
- Easiest route: Hike

Whiskey Dick Mountain is located 15 miles (24 km) east of Ellensburg, in Washington state. Within the 28,549-acre (115.53 km^{2}) Whiskey Dick Unit of the L.T. Murray Wildlife Area, it is the highest point on Windy Ridge. The site of the Wild Horse Wind and Solar Facility is on its southwest flank. The farm, with 149 wind turbines, is owned by Puget Sound Energy.

Public access to the power company's land, whether owned or leased, is available by permit for recreational purposes only. The area offers opportunities for hiking and hunting.

== See also ==
- Wild Horse Wind Farm
