= Moses Lake High School =

Public high school in Moses Lake, Washington

Location
- 803 Sharon Avenue East; Moses Lake, Washington, United States; 47°06′43″N 119°15′57″W

Information
- Type: Public, Coeducational
- Established: 1924
- School district: Moses Lake School District
- Principal: Sheila Kries
- Teaching staff: 83.30 (FTE)
- Enrollment: 1,979 (2023–2024)
- Student to teacher ratio: 23.76
- Colors: Maroon and Gold
- Athletics conference: Big 9 4A
- Mascot: Mavericks
- Rivals: Eastmont High School Wenatchee High School
- Yearbook: The Lake
- Website: mlhs.mlsd161.org

Moses Lake High School is a public high school in Moses Lake, Washington serving 2,375 students in grades 9–12. Moses Lake School District operates the school.

The current principal is Sheila Kries.

The district (of which this is the sole comprehensive high school) includes Moses Lake, Cascade Valley, Moses Lake North, and Wheeler.

== Demographics ==
42% of those who attend the high school are white, while 51.4% are Hispanic. 1.4% are black, 1.2% are Asian or Pacific Islander, 0.2% are American Indian or Alaska native, and 3.6% are of two or more races.

== Clubs and organizations ==
- Anime Club
- AFJROTC
- AVID
- Band
- Choir
- Culinary
- Drama Club
- FFA
- Floral
- GSA (Gay-Straight Alliance)
- History of Fashion Through Film
- Jewelry Club
- Key Club
- Knowledge Bowl
- Link Crew
- Math Club
- MECHA Club
- Mu Alpha Theta Math Honor Society
- National Honor Society
- ORCA Bowl
- Photography Club
- Promise for Tomorrow
- Science Olympiad
- SkillsUSA
- Table Top Club
- Thespian Troupe
- Youth Action Team

== Sports ==
- Male:
  - Football
  - Cross Country
  - Basketball
  - Swim & Dive
  - Wrestling
  - Baseball
  - Golf
  - Soccer
  - Tennis
  - Track
- Female:
  - Softball; Slow Pitch
  - Swim & Dive
  - Volleyball
  - Cross Country
  - Cheer
  - Drill
  - Basketball
  - Bowling
  - Wrestling
  - Softball; Fast Pitch
  - Golf
  - Tennis
  - Track
- Unified:
  - Basketball
  - Soccer

== Rankings ==
This school has an 85% graduation rate, an increase of 7.5% in the past 5 years. 63.5% of teachers hold a master's degree or higher have an average of 16.5 years of teaching experience.

== History ==
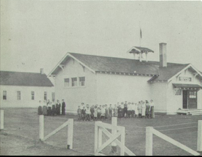
Neppel School Moses Lake's First

Moses Lake High School Started in 1924. The First Graduate was Ed Hull. The original name of MLHS in 1924 was Neppel School. Classes were held in a four-room building at the site of the present-day Rite-Aid

In 1946 a new larger building was built. The first Principal was Ray Darnall (1913-1980). He served from 1946 to 1948. In 1948 Darnall worked as a basketball coach.

In 1947 Vern Taylor was killed during a construction accident.

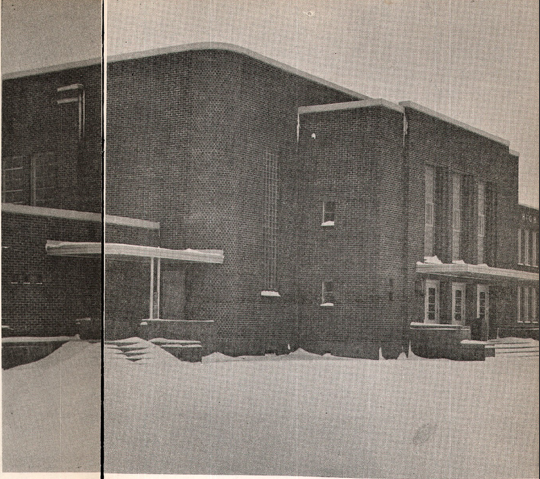
Moses Lake High School in the Winter of 1948

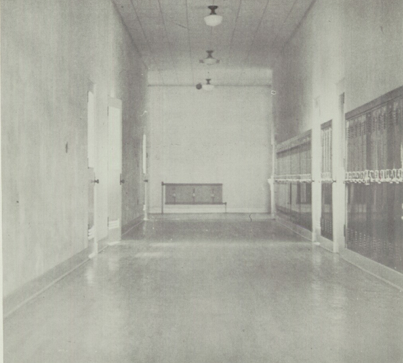
The Hallway at MLHS From 1946 to 1959
1. Ray Darnall 1946-1948
2. Osmond Darling 1948-1951
3. Robert C Smith 1951-1955
4. Winifield Fountain 1955-1957
5. John Lothespich 1957-1961
6. Delbert Milholland 1961-1971
7. Frank Kelly 1971-1973
8. Marr Marchbank 1973-1975
9. Lee Hutsell 1975-1979
10. Thomas Oxwang 1979-1981
11. Larry Smith 1981-2000
12. Dave Balcom 2000-2009
13. Dr. Joshua Meek 2009-2015
14. Mark Harris 2015-2017
15. Jake Long Fall 2017-Spring 2019
16. Triscia Hochstatter Fall 2019–Spring 2022
17. Sheila Kries Fall 2022–Present

=== 1959: New campus ===
In the Spring of 1959, Moses Lake High School moved locations. That building is currently Frontier Middle School.

The New Location had 7 different buildings.

The Hallways were arranged A, B, C, D, E, F and G. The J building was added in 1962–63.

The Principals who served during the era was

- John Lothespich
- Delbert Millholand
- Marr Marchbank
- Frank Kelly
- Lee Hutsell
- Tom Oxwang
- Larry Smith
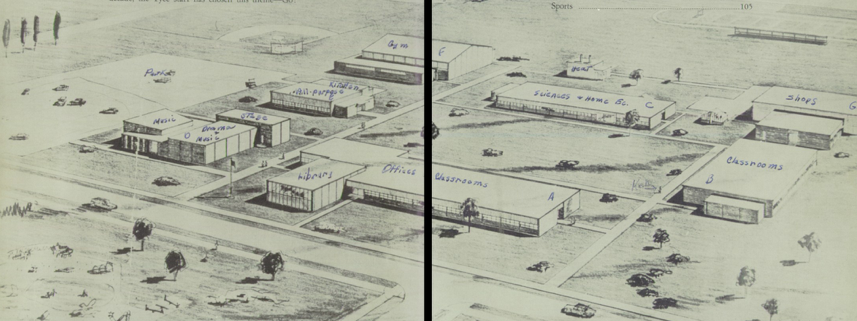
Moses Lake High School in 1959

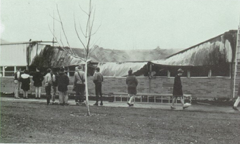
Some Students Explaining the Day After the Fire on C Building in 1969

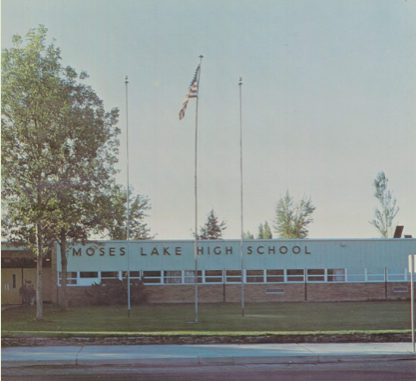
The Side of the Campus in 1974-75

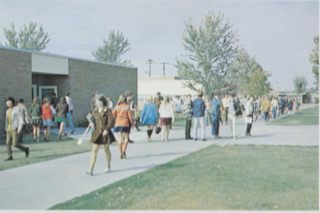
The Campus between classes in 1971

=== 1995–1997: Modernization ===
In 1995 the high school was modernized with the following:

- Connecting the nine detached buildings
- Removal of lockers
- Adding two new gyms.

=== 2022: Rebranding ===
April 2021, Washington Legislature passed House Bill 1356 prohibiting the inappropriate use of Native American names, symbols, or images as public school mascots, logos, or team names without tribal consent. In February, 2022, the Confederated Tribes of the Colville Reservation revoked the use of the 'Chiefs' mascot for Moses Lake High School in addition to the 'Braves' at Columbia Middle School (formerly Chief Moses Middle School) and the 'Warriors' at Frontier Middle School in Moses Lake. Moses Lake High School began the rebranding process in 2022. With student, staff, and community involvement, the 'Mavericks' was selected as the new mascot.
