= Grant County, Washington =

County in Washington, United States

- County
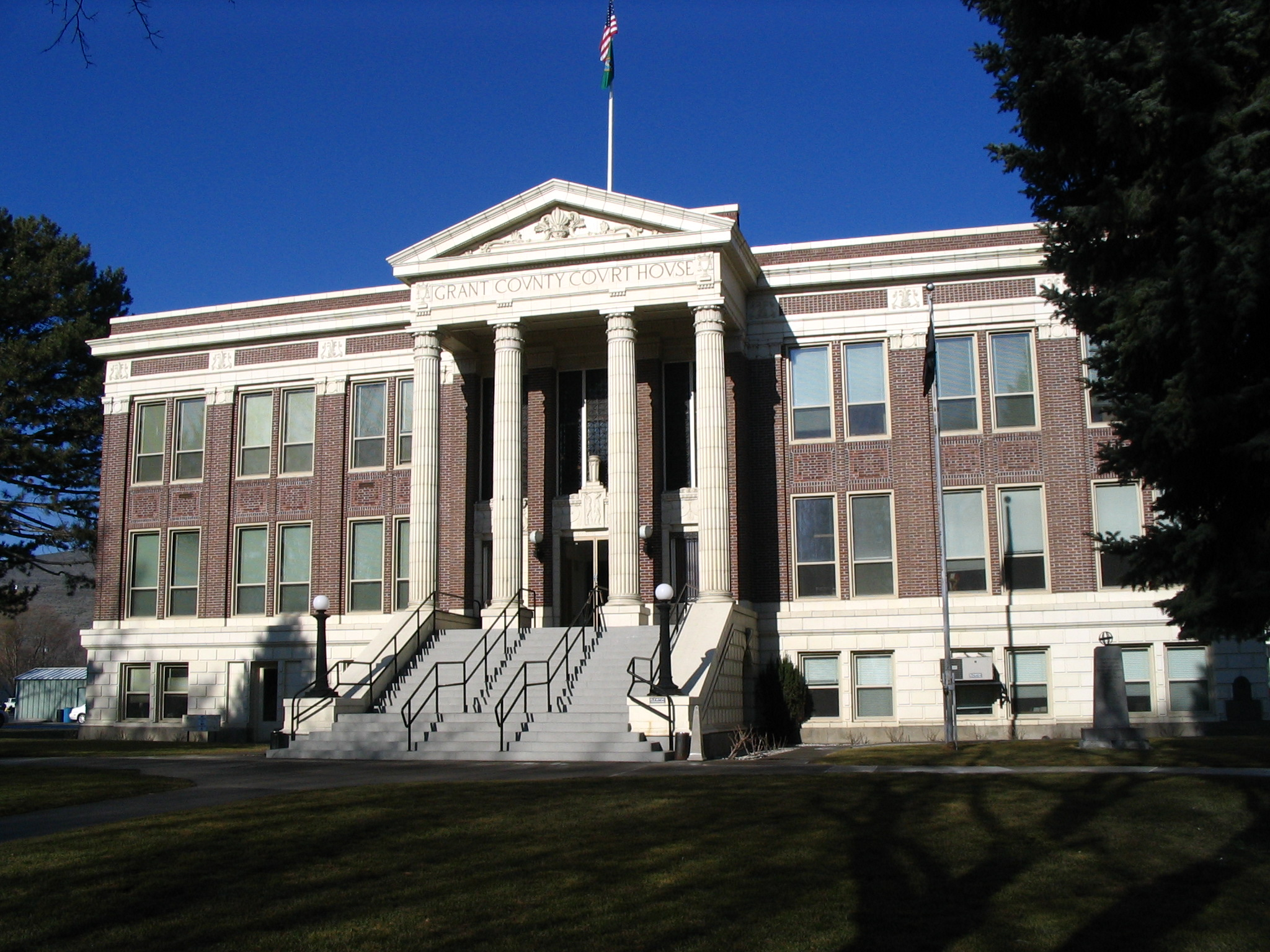
- Grant County Courthouse

- Seal

- Location within the U.S. state of Washington
- Coordinates: 47°12′49″N 119°28′04″W
- Country: United States
- State: Washington
- Founded: February 24, 1909
- Named for: Ulysses S. Grant
- Seat: Ephrata
- Largest city: Moses Lake

Area
  - Total: 2,791 sq mi (7,230 km^{2})
  - Land: 2,680 sq mi (6,900 km^{2})
  - Water: 112 sq mi (290 km^{2}) 4.0%

Population (2020)
  - Total: 99,123
  - Estimate (2025): 105,727 ▲
  - Density: 39.5/sq mi (15.3/km^{2})
- Time zone: UTC−8 (Pacific)
  - Summer (DST): UTC−7 (PDT)
- Congressional district: 4th
- Website: grantcountywa.gov

Grant County is a county located in the U.S. state of Washington. As of the 2020 census, the population was 99,123. The county seat is Ephrata, and the largest city is Moses Lake. The county was formed out of Douglas County in February 1909 and is named for U.S. President Ulysses S. Grant.

Grant County comprises the Moses Lake, WA Micropolitan Statistical Area, which is also part of the Moses Lake-Othello, WA Combined Statistical Area.

== History ==
Native American cultures in the area included the Interior Salish, Wenatchi, and Okanagan. The first white settlers began to arrive in the mid-to-late-19th century, primarily with the goal of raising livestock. One government official described the area in 1879 as, "…a desolation where even the most hopeful can find nothing in its future prospects to cheer."

When railroads arrived they also brought new settlers, and the economy began a shift from ranching to dryland farming. This transition required the people to have ready access to water, and irrigation became a necessity. The first large-scale irrigation attempts began in 1898, but it would be years before real success.

With the influx of dryland farming, the county soon boasted access to three major railway systems; the Great Northern Railway, Northern Pacific Railroad and the Chicago, Milwaukee & St. Paul Railroad. In addition, the Columbia River in this area was navigable. This allowed crops to be transported out of the area easily. Towns like Wilson Creek, Quincy and Ephrata began to thrive.

The Washington State Legislature officially created Grant County on February 24, 1909, naming it in the memory of Ulysses S. Grant, the 18th president of the United States, and a major contributor to the Union victory in the American Civil War. The county seat was located in Ephrata. The area's population at the time stood at around 8700 people.

The Columbia Basin Project, which ultimately produced the Grand Coulee Dam with its associated irrigation and hydroelectric generating grid, was an outgrowth of the 1902 creation of the United States Bureau of Reclamation. When that agency began studying feasibility of projects in the Northwestern United States, competing groups from Spokane, Wenatchee, Ephrata and elsewhere advanced competing possibilities. One idea was to dam the Columbia River at Grand Coulee. This concept was approved in 1933, and construction continued in the following decades. The project would fundamentally change the region forever.

== Geography ==
According to the United States Census Bureau, the county has a total area of 2,791 square miles (7,230 km^{2}), of which 2,680 square miles (6,900 km^{2}) is land and 112 square miles (290 km^{2}) (4.0%) is water. It is the fourth-largest county in Washington by area.

The environmental climate of Grant County is characterized by hot summers and cold winters. Rainshadow caused by the Cascade mountains separates eastern Washington, including Grant County, from western Washington's more temperate and oceanic climate.

A sign alongside Interstate Highway I-90 where it enters Grant County welcomes travelers to Grant County and says the county is "The nation's leading potato producing county".

=== Geographic features ===
- Columbia River
- Grand Coulee
- Moses Lake
- Potholes Reservoir
- Soap Lake
- Ulysses S. Peak, unofficial name of county high point

=== Major highways ===
- I-90
- I-90 BL
- U.S. Route 2
- State Route 17
- State Route 28

=== Adjacent counties ===
- Douglas County - north
- Okanogan County - northeast
- Adams County - east
- Lincoln County - east
- Franklin County - southeast
- Benton County - south
- Yakima County - southwest
- Kittitas County - west

=== National protected areas ===
- Columbia National Wildlife Refuge (part)
- Hanford Reach National Monument (part)
- Lake Roosevelt National Recreation Area (part)
- Saddle Mountain National Wildlife Refuge (part)

== Demographics ==
Historical population
Census	Pop.	Note	%±
1910	8,698		—
1920	7,771		−10.7%
1930	5,666		−27.1%
1940	14,668		158.9%
1950	24,346		66.0%
1960	46,477		90.9%
1970	41,881		−9.9%
1980	48,522		15.9%
1990	54,758		12.9%
2000	74,698		36.4%
2010	89,120		19.3%
2020	99,123		11.2%
2025 (est.)	105,727	▲	6.7%
U.S. Decennial Census:

=== 2020 census ===
As of the 2020 census, the county had a population of 99,123. Of the residents, 28.5% were under the age of 18 and 14.6% were 65 years of age or older; the median age was 34.2 years. For every 100 females there were 105.0 males, and for every 100 females age 18 and over there were 106.3 males. 55.1% of residents lived in urban areas and 44.9% lived in rural areas.

Grant County, Washington – Racial and ethnic composition Note: the US Census treats Hispanic/Latino as an ethnic category. This table excludes Latinos from the racial categories and assigns them to a separate category. Hispanics/Latinos may be of any race.
Race / Ethnicity (NH = Non-Hispanic)	Pop 2000	Pop 2010	Pop 2020	% 2000	% 2010	% 2020
White alone (NH)	48,883	51,066	50,250	65.44%	57.30%	50.69%
Black or African American alone (NH)	653	710	651	0.87%	0.80%	0.66%
Native American or Alaska Native alone (NH)	716	779	830	0.96%	0.87%	0.84%
Asian alone (NH)	632	783	1,153	0.85%	0.88%	1.16%
Pacific Islander alone (NH)	28	54	96	0.04%	0.06%	0.10%
Other race alone (NH)	80	95	397	0.11%	0.11%	0.40%
Mixed race or Multiracial (NH)	1,230	1,470	3,345	1.65%	1.65%	3.37%
Hispanic or Latino (any race)	22,476	34,163	42,401	30.09%	38.33%	42.78%
Total	74,698	89,120	99,123	100.00%	100.00%	100.00%

The population density was 37.0 people per square mile (14.3 people/km^{2}).

The racial makeup of the county was 57.9% White, 0.8% Black or African American, 1.7% American Indian and Alaska Native, 1.2% Asian, 25.0% from some other race, and 13.3% from two or more races. Hispanic or Latino residents of any race comprised 42.8% of the population.

There were 34,078 households in the county, of which 37.7% had children under the age of 18 living with them and 22.1% had a female householder with no spouse or partner present. About 23.5% of all households were made up of individuals and 9.9% had someone living alone who was 65 years of age or older.

There were 38,635 housing units, of which 11.8% were vacant. Among occupied housing units, 62.2% were owner-occupied and 37.8% were renter-occupied. The homeowner vacancy rate was 1.4% and the rental vacancy rate was 6.9%.

The median income for a household in the county was $63,566, and the per capita income was $27,466. 11.7% of the population was below the poverty line.

=== 2010 census ===
As of the 2010 census, there were 89,120 people, 30,041 households, and 21,800 families living in the county. The population density was 33.3 inhabitants per square mile (12.9/km^{2}). There were 35,083 housing units at an average density of 13.1 per square mile (5.1/km^{2}). The racial makeup of the county was 72.8% white, 1.2% American Indian, 1.1% black or African American, 0.9% Asian, 0.1% Pacific islander, 20.4% from other races, and 3.5% from two or more races. Those of Hispanic or Latino origin made up 38.3% of the population. In terms of ancestry, 15.5% were German, 8.9% were English, 7.1% were Irish, and 3.9% were American.

Of the 30,041 households, 40.6% had children under the age of 18 living with them, 54.7% were married couples living together, 11.5% had a female householder with no husband present, 27.4% were non-families, and 22.0% of all households were made up of individuals. The average household size was 2.93 and the average family size was 3.40. The median age was 32.1 years.

The median income for a household in the county was $42,572 and the median income for a family was $50,065. Males had a median income of $39,530 versus $27,417 for females. The per capita income for the county was $19,718. About 15.7% of families and 20.4% of the population were below the poverty line, including 28.4% of those under age 18 and 7.2% of those age 65 or over.

== Communities ==
=== Cities ===
- Electric City
- Ephrata (county seat)
- George
- Grand Coulee
- Mattawa
- Moses Lake
- Quincy
- Royal City
- Soap Lake
- Warden

=== Towns ===
- Coulee City
- Coulee Dam (partial)
- Hartline
- Krupp (formally known as Marlin)
- Wilson Creek

=== Census-designated places ===
- Banks Lake South
- Beverly
- Cascade Valley
- Crescent Bar
- Desert Aire
- Lakeview
- Marine View
- Moses Lake North
- Schwana
- Sunland Estates
- Wheeler

=== Other unincorporated communities ===
- Adco
- Adrian
- Burke
- Lakeview Park
- Mae
- Ruff
- Smyrna
- Stratford
- Trinidad
- Winchester

== Education ==
School districts in the county include:

- Almira School District
- Coulee-Hartline School District
- Ephrata School District
- Grand Coulee Dam School District
- Moses Lake School District
- Odessa School District
- Othello School District
- Quincy School District
- Royal School District
- Soap Lake School District
- Wahluke School District
- Warden School District
- Wilson Creek School District

== Politics ==
Grant County is a reliably Republican county in presidential elections; it has not voted for the Democratic candidate since Lyndon B. Johnson's landslide victory in 1964. It has cast at least 60% of its vote for the Republican presidential candidate in all seven elections since 2000.

United States presidential election results for Grant County, Washington
Year	Republican		Democratic		Third party(ies)	
Year	No.	%	No.	%	No.	%
1912	458	17.41%	771	29.32%	1,401	53.27%
1916	1,205	39.77%	1,563	51.58%	262	8.65%
1920	1,378	58.24%	684	28.91%	304	12.85%
1924	813	40.87%	332	16.69%	844	42.43%
1928	1,407	68.07%	641	31.01%	19	0.92%
1932	840	34.85%	1,376	57.10%	194	8.05%
1936	694	13.03%	4,560	85.59%	74	1.39%
1940	1,487	26.55%	4,097	73.15%	17	0.30%
1944	1,530	39.21%	2,354	60.33%	18	0.46%
1948	2,081	33.15%	4,067	64.79%	129	2.06%
1952	4,512	50.61%	4,381	49.14%	22	0.25%
1956	6,603	48.73%	6,938	51.21%	8	0.06%
1960	7,568	50.44%	7,400	49.32%	37	0.25%
1964	6,065	42.04%	8,352	57.89%	10	0.07%
1968	7,007	48.77%	5,773	40.18%	1,587	11.05%
1972	9,370	59.25%	5,487	34.70%	957	6.05%
1976	9,192	51.87%	7,777	43.89%	752	4.24%
1980	11,152	61.29%	5,673	31.18%	1,371	7.53%
1984	12,888	65.81%	6,298	32.16%	398	2.03%
1988	10,859	57.76%	7,564	40.24%	376	2.00%
1992	9,503	43.35%	7,278	33.20%	5,140	23.45%
1996	10,895	49.83%	8,065	36.88%	2,906	13.29%
2000	15,830	66.52%	7,073	29.72%	895	3.76%
2004	17,799	68.47%	7,779	29.92%	417	1.60%
2008	17,153	62.52%	9,601	34.99%	684	2.49%
2012	17,852	64.78%	8,950	32.48%	756	2.74%
2016	18,518	63.29%	7,810	26.69%	2,930	10.01%
2020	24,764	65.72%	11,819	31.37%	1,097	2.91%
2024	24,326	67.10%	10,806	29.81%	1,121	3.09%

== Economy ==
Grant is the #1 crop-producing County in the State, producing a large part of the Washington hay harvest.

== See also ==
- Grant County Public Utility District
- National Register of Historic Places listings in Grant County, Washington
