= Moses Lake, Washington =

City in Washington, United States

- City
- Downtown Moses Lake

- Location of Moses Lake, Washington
- Coordinates: 47°8′41″N 119°16′33″W
- Country: United States
- State: Washington
- County: Grant
- Founded: 1911
- Incorporated: September 15, 1938

Government
  - Type: Council–manager
  - Mayor: Dustin Swartz (R)

Area
  - City: 21.098 sq mi (54.644 km^{2})
  - Land: 18.136 sq mi (46.972 km^{2})
  - Water: 2.962 sq mi (7.672 km^{2}) 14.04%
- Elevation: 1,060 ft (323 m)

Population (2020)
  - City: 25,146
  - Estimate (2024): 26,969
  - Density: 1,487.1/sq mi (574.19/km^{2})
  - Urban: 38,751
  - Metro: 104,717
  - Combined: 125,756
- Time zone: UTC–8 (Pacific (PST))
  - Summer (DST): UTC–7 (PDT)
- ZIP Code: 98837
- Area code: 509
- FIPS code: 53-47245
- GNIS feature ID: 2411173
- Website: cityofml.com

Moses Lake is a city in Grant County, Washington, United States. The population was 25,146 at the 2020 census, and was estimated to be 26,969 in 2024. Moses Lake is the most populous city in Grant County. The city anchors the Moses Lake Micropolitan area, which includes all of Grant County and is part of the Moses Lake–Othello combined statistical area.

Moses Lake, on which the city lies, is made up of three main arms over 18 miles (29 km) long and up to one mile (1.6 km) wide. It is the largest natural body of fresh water in Grant County and has over 120 miles (190 km) of shoreline covering 6,500 acres (2,600 ha). Before it was dammed in the early 1900s and then incorporated into the Columbia Basin Project, Moses Lake was a smaller shallow lake. To the south of the town is the Potholes Reservoir and the Columbia National Wildlife Refuge that has a number of seep lakes and vast amounts of migratory birds and other fauna natural to the area.

== History ==
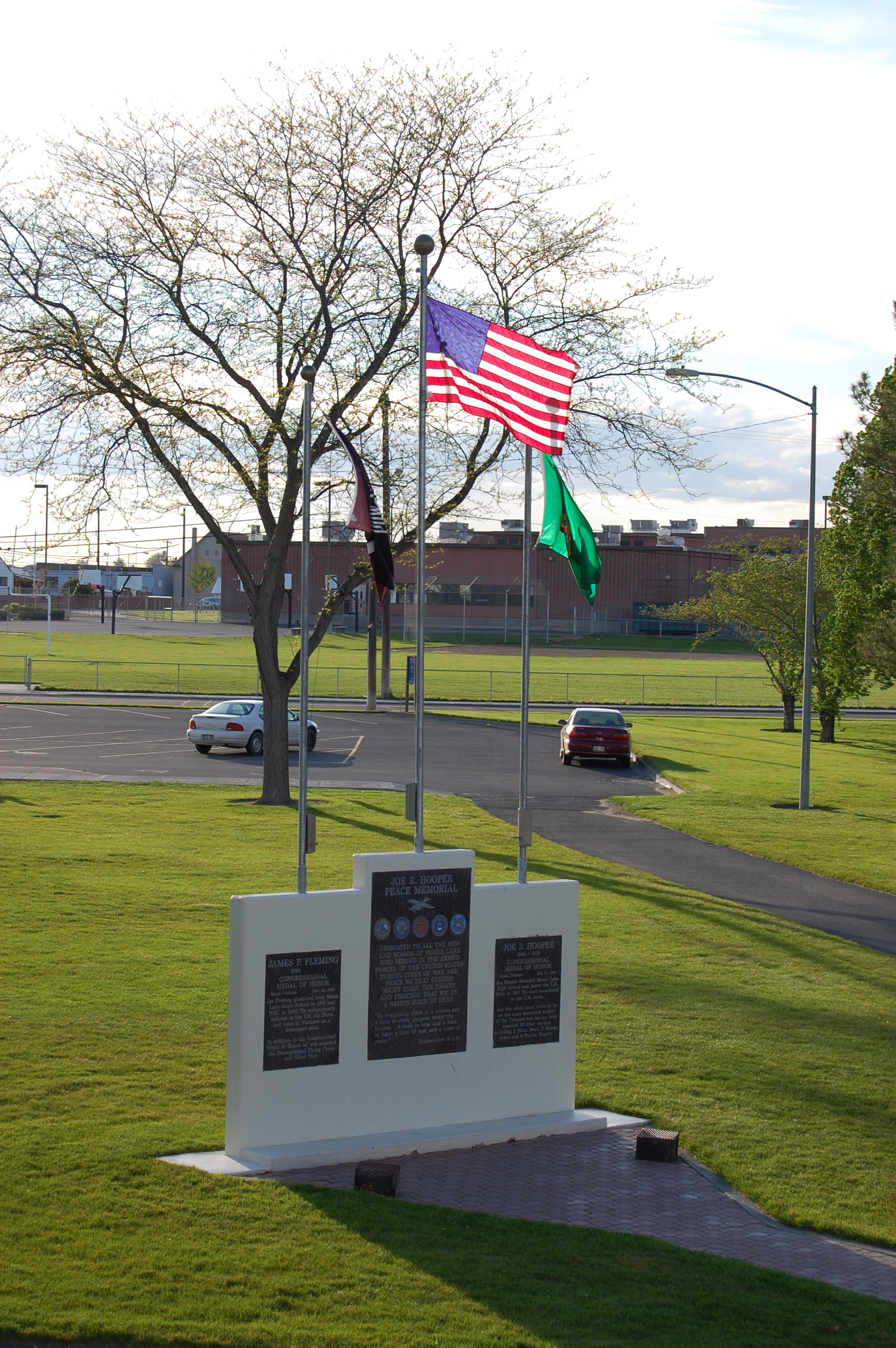
Moses Lake War Memorial

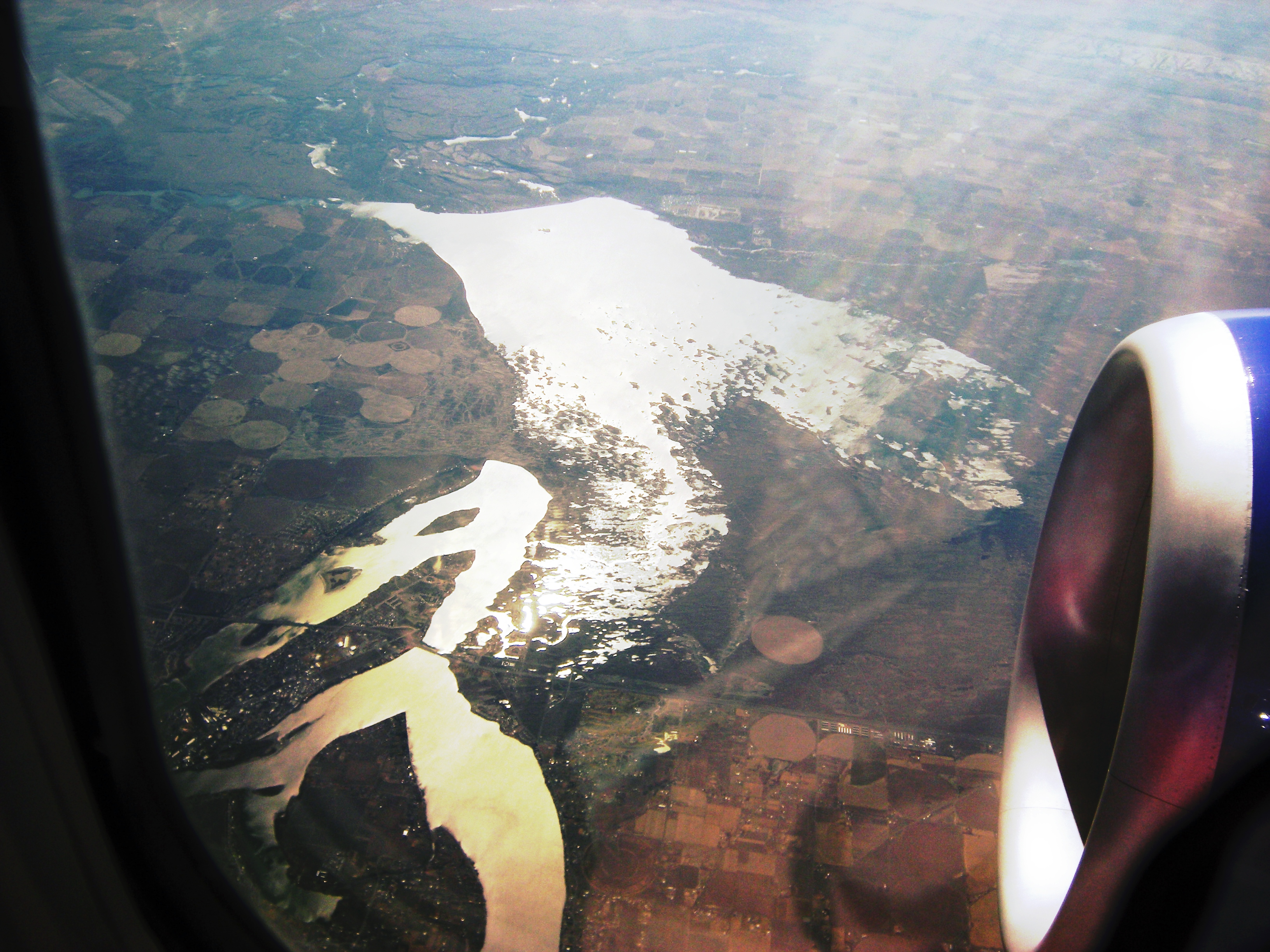
Aerial view of Moses Lake and Potholes Reservoir

Before the construction of Grand Coulee Dam on the Columbia River in 1941 and Moses Lake Army Air Base in 1942 the area was largely barren. Native Americans knew the area as Houaph, which meant willow. Chief Moses was leader of the Sinkiuse tribe from 1859 to 1899, and was forced to negotiate with white settlers who began to settle in the area in the 1880s. Under pressure from the government, Chief Moses traded the Columbia Basin land for a reservation that stretched from Lake Chelan north to the Canada–US border. The government later traded again for what is now the Colville Indian Reservation.

The new settlers named the lake in honor of Chief Moses. The city was originally named Neppel. The first settlers established fisheries and farms — some of the first exported items were carp, jackrabbits and fruit — but irrigation attempts failed and settlers left at about the same rate as they came. When the town was incorporated and renamed Moses Lake in 1938, the population was estimated at 302 people.

The arrival of the air base in 1942 and irrigation water pumped from Grand Coulee Dam in 1955 offered newcomers a reason and a way to settle in an area that previously had little to offer other than good fishing and a place to water sheep and cattle. Moses Lake was quickly transformed into a hub for a vast region where transportation, agriculture and recreation came together.

The air base was built to train World War II pilots to fly the P-38 Lightning and B-17 Flying Fortress, two planes that were essential to the war effort. The base was closed after the war ended, but reopened in 1948 as a U.S. Air Force base and test area for Boeing's B-47 Stratojet and B-50 Superfortress.

The B-47 tests led to development of modern commercial jetliners still used today. Fighter jets were stationed there to protect Grand Coulee Dam to the north and the Hanford site to the south. Boeing still uses the airport as a test and evaluation facility for its aircraft. Japan Airlines used the airport as a training area from November 1968 until March 2009. The old air base is now owned by the Port of Moses Lake and is home to Grant County International Airport, Big Bend Community College and several businesses.

Farmers, meanwhile, had developed new methods to irrigate water from the lake and from the Columbia River and began planting expansive irrigated acreage. When the Columbia Basin Project began to deliver water to the area in the mid-1950s, farms expanded by thousands of acres, growing potatoes, corn, onions, carrots and sugar beets.

In little more than a decade, Moses Lake's population grew from 300 to 2,679 in 1950. A town on the west side of Moses Lake, named Westlake, was platted in 1945 and incorporated in 1958. The town's population peaked at 500 but later declined to 250 by 1970 as properties in its southern half were acquired by the Bureau of Land Reclamation to address seepage issues created by the raising of the Potholes Reservoir. Westlake was annexed into Moses Lake in 1972 due to the high cost to maintain existing municipal operations and low tax revenue.

== Geography ==
According to the United States Census Bureau, the city has a total area of 21.098 square miles (54.64 km^{2}), of which 18.136 square miles (46.97 km^{2}) is land and 2.962 square miles (7.67 km^{2}) (14.04%) is water.

=== Landscape ===
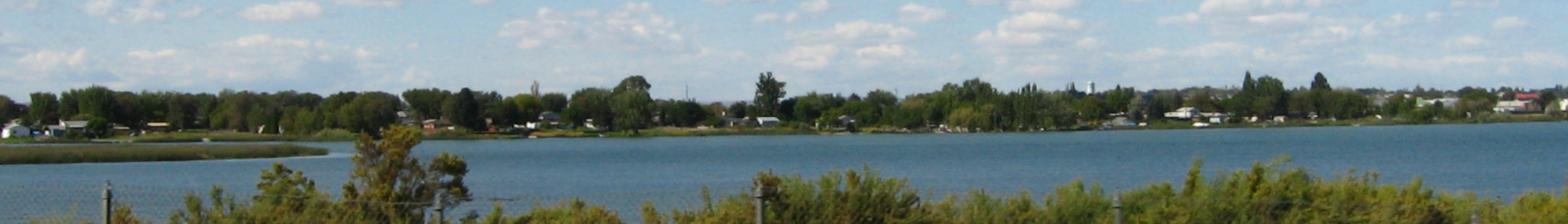
Moses Lake.

== Demographics ==
Historical population
Census	Pop.	Note	%±
1940	326		—
1950	2,679		721.8%
1960	11,299		321.8%
1970	10,310		−8.8%
1980	10,629		3.1%
1990	11,235		5.7%
2000	14,953		33.1%
2010	20,366		36.2%
2020	25,146		23.5%
2024 (est.)	26,969		7.2%
U.S. Decennial Census; 2020 Census

The city currently ranks #44 out of 281 municipalities in the State for population.

According to realtor website Zillow, the average price of a home as of May 31, 2025, in Moses Lake is $371,473.

As of the 2023 American Community Survey, there are 9,756 estimated households in Moses Lake with an average of 2.59 persons per household. The city has a median household income of $71,854. Approximately 15.4% of the city's population lives at or below the poverty line. Moses Lake has an estimated 64.3% employment rate, with 21.7% of the population holding a bachelor's degree or higher and 88.4% holding a high school diploma.

The top five reported ancestries (people were allowed to report up to two ancestries, thus the figures will generally add to more than 100%) were English (74.6%), Spanish (24.0%), Indo-European (0.9%), Asian and Pacific Islander (0.6%), and Other (0.0%).

=== Racial and ethnic composition ===
Moses Lake, Washington – racial and ethnic composition Note: the US Census treats Hispanic/Latino as an ethnic category. This table excludes Latinos from the racial categories and assigns them to a separate category. Hispanics/Latinos may be of any race.
Race / ethnicity (NH = non-Hispanic)	Pop. 1990	Pop. 2000	Pop. 2010	Pop. 2020	% 1990	% 2000	% 2010	% 2020
White alone (NH)	8,713	10,314	13,063	13,637	77.55%	68.98%	64.14%	54.23%
Black or African American alone (NH)	205	238	283	299	1.82%	1.59%	1.39%	1.19%
Native American or Alaska Native alone (NH)	69	120	135	151	0.61%	0.80%	0.66%	0.60%
Asian alone (NH)	193	208	286	667	1.72%	1.39%	1.40%	2.65%
Native Hawaiian or Pacific Islander alone (NH)	—	10	24	46	—	0.07%	0.12%	0.18%
Other race alone (NH)	15	16	35	117	0.13%	0.11%	0.17%	0.47%
Mixed race or multiracial (NH)	—	247	417	1,095	—	1.65%	2.05%	4.35%
Hispanic or Latino (any race)	2,040	3,800	6,123	9,134	18.16%	25.41%	30.06%	36.32%
Total	11,235	14,953	20,366	25,146	100.00%	100.00%	100.00%	100.00%

=== 2020 census ===
As of the 2020 census, there were 25,146 people, 9,564 households, and 5,982 families residing in the city. The population density was 1,401.28 inhabitants per square mile (541.0/km^{2}). There were 10,257 housing units at an average density of 571.58 per square mile (220.7/km^{2}).

The median age was 32.9 years, with 28.1% of residents under the age of 18 and 14.0% of residents 65 years of age or older. For every 100 females there were 99.2 males, and for every 100 females age 18 and over there were 98.3 males.

Of the households, 35.6% had children under the age of 18 living in them, 41.5% were married-couple households, 22.0% were households with a male householder and no spouse or partner present, and 26.0% were households with a female householder and no spouse or partner present. About 30.0% of all households were made up of individuals and 11.2% had someone living alone who was 65 years of age or older. Of the 10,257 housing units, 6.8% were vacant, with a homeowner vacancy rate of 1.5% and a rental vacancy rate of 7.9%.

The 2020 census reported that 99.9% of residents lived in urban areas and 0.1% lived in rural areas.

Racial composition as of the 2020 census
Race	Number	Percent
White	15,776	62.7%
Black or African American	352	1.4%
American Indian and Alaska Native	347	1.4%
Asian	688	2.7%
Native Hawaiian and Other Pacific Islander	54	0.2%
Some other race	4,422	17.6%
Two or more races	3,507	13.9%
Hispanic or Latino (of any race)	9,134	36.3%

=== 2010 census ===
As of the 2010 census, there were 20,366 people, 7,600 households, and 4,995 families residing in the city. The population density was 1,292.7 inhabitants per square mile (499.1/km^{2}). There were 8,365 housing units at an average density of 531.1 inhabitants per square mile (205.1/km^{2}). The racial makeup of the city was 76.35% White, 1.64% African American, 1.05% Native American, 1.46% Asian, 0.14% Pacific Islander, 14.95% from some other races and 4.41% from two or more races. Hispanic or Latino people of any race were 30.06% of the population.

There were 7,600 households, of which 38.4% had children under the age of 18 living with them, 46.3% were married couples living together, 13.2% had a female householder with no husband present, 6.2% had a male householder with no wife present, and 34.3% were non-families. 27.6% of all households were made up of individuals, and 10.9% had someone living alone who was 65 years of age or older. The average household size was 2.66 and the average family size was 3.25.

The median age in the city was 32.1 years. 29.6% of residents were under the age of 18; 9.6% were between the ages of 18 and 24; 27% were from 25 to 44; 21.4% were from 45 to 64; and 12.3% were 65 years of age or older. The gender makeup of the city was 49.4% male and 50.6% female.

=== 2000 census ===
As of the 2000 census, there were 14,953 people, 5,642 households, and 3,740 families residing in the city. The population density was 1,468.6 inhabitants per square mile (567.0/km^{2}). There were 6,263 housing units at an average density of 615.1 inhabitants per square mile (237.5/km^{2}). The racial makeup of the city was 77.16% White, 1.69% African American, 1.02% Native American, 1.43% Asian, 0.07% Pacific Islander, 15.44% from some other races and 3.20% from two or more races. Hispanic or Latino people of any race were 25.41% of the population.

There were 5,642 households, out of which 35.1% had children under the age of 18 living with them, 50.3% were married couples living together, 11.5% had a female householder with no husband present, and 33.7% were non-families. 27.4% of all households were made up of individuals, and 11.2% had someone living alone who was 65 years of age or older. The average household size was 2.60 and the average family size was 3.20.

In the city, the population was spread out, with 28.8% under the age of 18, 10.6% from 18 to 24, 28.0% from 25 to 44, 19.0% from 45 to 64, and 13.5% who were 65 years of age or older. The median age was 32 years. For every 100 females, there were 96.3 males. For every 100 females age 18 and over, there were 94.1 males.

The median income for a household in the city was $36,467, and the median income for a family was $42,096. Males had a median income of $34,945 versus $25,193 for females. The per capita income for the city was $16,644. About 11.0% of families and 15.1% of the population were below the poverty line, including 18.7% of those under age 18 and 10.5% of those age 65 or over.

== Climate ==
Moses Lake has a dry climate, and is classed as a semi-arid climate. It is warm during summer, when temperatures tend to be in the 80s (°F) and somewhat cold during winter, when temperatures tend to be in the 30s (°F). The warmest month is July, with an average maximum temperature of 88.20 °F (31.22 °C). The coldest month is January, with an average minimum temperature of 21.70 °F (−5.72 °C).

Temperature variations between night and day are greater during summer (27 °F (15 °C)), and less during winter (14 °F (7.8 °C)).

The annual average precipitation at Moses Lake is 7.69 inches (195 mm). Although rainfall is fairly evenly distributed throughout the year, it is not unusual in mid-summer for a month or six weeks to pass without any measurable rainfall. The wettest month is December with an average rainfall of 1.19 inches (30 mm).

Climate data for Moses Lake, Washington (Grant County International Airport) (1991–2020 normals, extremes 1949–1966, 1997–present)
Month	Jan	Feb	Mar	Apr	May	Jun	Jul	Aug	Sep	Oct	Nov	Dec	Year
Record high °F (°C)	60 (16)	65 (18)	75 (24)	89 (32)	97 (36)	114 (46)	109 (43)	112 (44)	100 (38)	86 (30)	70 (21)	68 (20)	114 (46)
Mean maximum °F (°C)	52.2 (11.2)	56.3 (13.5)	68.2 (20.1)	79.3 (26.3)	89.9 (32.2)	97.5 (36.4)	103.1 (39.5)	102.1 (38.9)	93.3 (34.1)	76.9 (24.9)	62.5 (16.9)	52.5 (11.4)	104.5 (40.3)
Mean daily maximum °F (°C)	36.4 (2.4)	44.1 (6.7)	54.9 (12.7)	63.7 (17.6)	73.7 (23.2)	80.4 (26.9)	89.7 (32.1)	88.3 (31.3)	78.7 (25.9)	62.8 (17.1)	46.3 (7.9)	36.2 (2.3)	62.9 (17.2)
Daily mean °F (°C)	30.1 (−1.1)	35.3 (1.8)	43.3 (6.3)	50.5 (10.3)	59.5 (15.3)	66.2 (19.0)	73.4 (23.0)	72.2 (22.3)	62.8 (17.1)	49.9 (9.9)	37.6 (3.1)	29.9 (−1.2)	50.9 (10.5)
Mean daily minimum °F (°C)	23.8 (−4.6)	26.6 (−3.0)	31.7 (−0.2)	37.3 (2.9)	45.4 (7.4)	52.0 (11.1)	57.2 (14.0)	56.1 (13.4)	47.0 (8.3)	36.9 (2.7)	28.8 (−1.8)	23.5 (−4.7)	38.9 (3.8)
Mean minimum °F (°C)	8.2 (−13.2)	14.3 (−9.8)	21.4 (−5.9)	25.7 (−3.5)	32.7 (0.4)	41.9 (5.5)	47.8 (8.8)	46.2 (7.9)	36.0 (2.2)	22.5 (−5.3)	13.3 (−10.4)	8.0 (−13.3)	0.7 (−17.4)
Record low °F (°C)	−22 (−30)	−9 (−23)	1 (−17)	21 (−6)	25 (−4)	37 (3)	42 (6)	42 (6)	27 (−3)	5 (−15)	−19 (−28)	−13 (−25)	−22 (−30)
Average precipitation inches (mm)	1.02 (26)	0.65 (17)	0.73 (19)	0.65 (17)	0.72 (18)	0.73 (19)	0.26 (6.6)	0.15 (3.8)	0.26 (6.6)	0.66 (17)	0.87 (22)	1.11 (28)	7.81 (198)
Average precipitation days (≥ 0.01 in)	9.7	6.8	7.2	5.5	6.2	5.0	1.7	2.0	2.8	7.1	9.7	10.3	74.0
Source: NOAA

== Economy ==
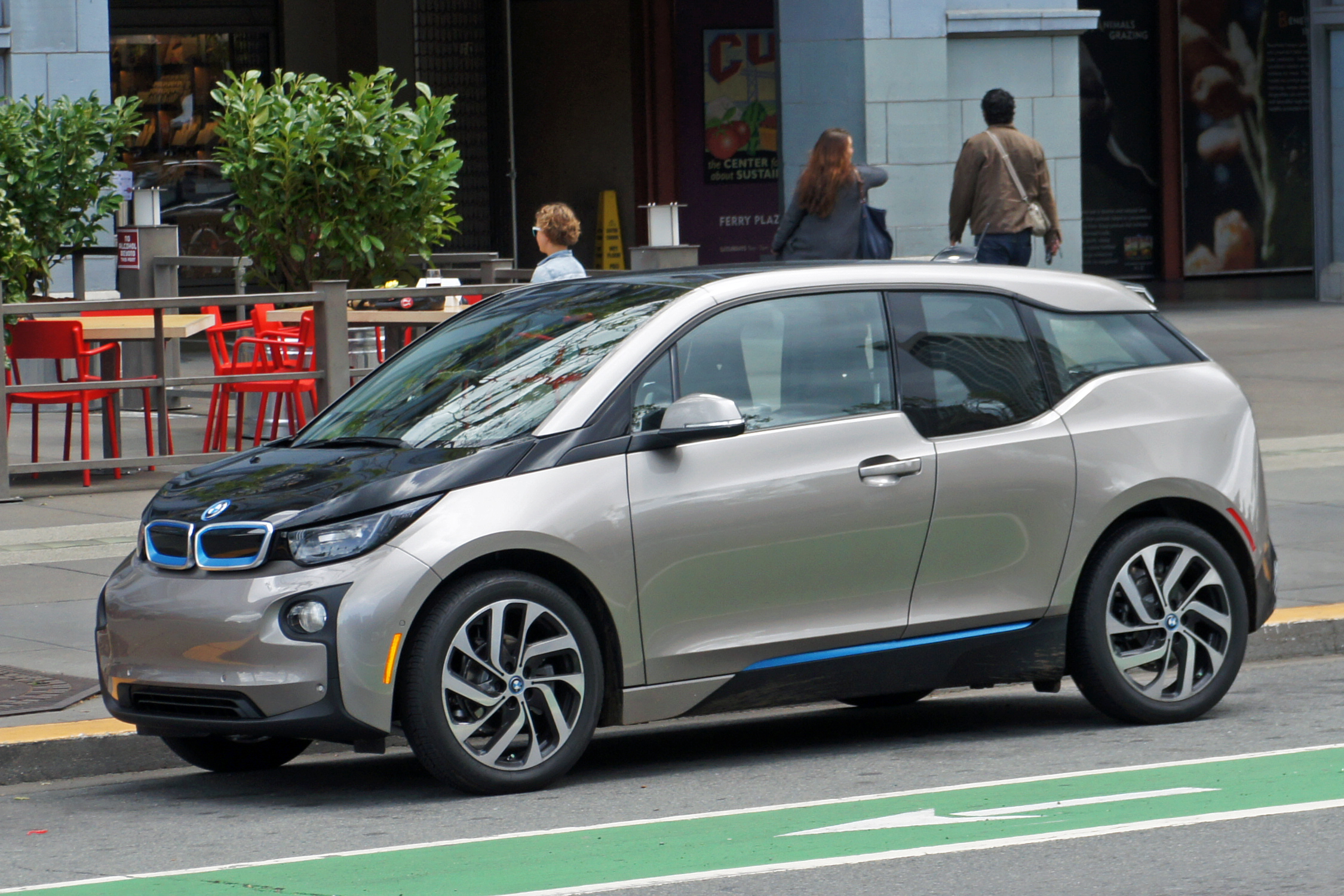
The BMW i3 electric car uses carbon fiber–reinforced plastic manufactured in Moses Lake.

Moses Lake's historic economic base has been agriculture, but now includes considerable manufacturing and technology. Several companies have moved to the area, including REC Silicon (one of the world's largest manufacturers of polysilicon, used in solar panels). Moses Lake has also attracted some alternative fuel companies, such as Washington Ethanol & Washington Biodiesel.

BMW, in partnership with the SGL Group, began construction in July 2010 on a $100 million carbon-fiber manufacturing plant. The plant was designed to produce 300 tons of carbon fiber per year from a single production building, and began operations in 2011. In 2013, ground was broken for a second 300-ton building, bringing projected production to 600 tons per year. In 2014, a third 300-ton building was started. When the third building is completed, SGL Moses Lake will be the largest producer of carbon fiber in the world. Mitsubishi in 2016 announced that the company would use the port of Moses Lake for its new regional jet (MRJ) FAA flight testing. The testing will be completed by the end of 2018.

Several manufacturers of electric vehicle batteries have factories or research facilities in Moses Lake due to its proximity to hydroelectricity and silane processors for silicon. The U.S. Department of Energy awarded grants to fund the construction of plants for Group14 and Sila Nanotechnologies that are expected to open in 2024. Sila plans to expand from an initial workforce of 100 employees to 500 within a few years of operation at the factory, which will generate 20 gigawatts of battery capacity by 2026.

Other major corporations that have facilities in (or are based in) Moses Lake include:

- Boeing
- Dell
- Sabey
- Terex/AWP (Genie Industries)
- Guardian Industries
- ConAgra Foods
- Basic American Foods
- Moses Lake Industries
- J.R. Simplot Co.
- International Paper
- Twelve

== Media ==
- Columbia Basin Herald, the local daily newspaper
- Source One News (formerly iFiber One News), a local internet services provider

== Transportation ==
=== Road ===
Moses Lake is bisected by two major highways that bypass the city center: Interstate 90 and State Route 17. State Route 171 and Interstate 90 Business serve the city's downtown, connecting to the two highways.

=== Rail ===
The Columbia Basin Railroad is headquartered in Moses Lake and operates the city's railroad. It is the busiest shortline railroad in Eastern Washington.

During the 1990s, a high-speed rail line between Seattle and Moses Lake was proposed, primarily to use Grant County International Airport as a satellite airport for the Seattle metropolitan area.

=== Public transportation ===
Moses Lake and Grant County are served by the Grant Transit Authority, which runs several bus routes within the city and intercity bus service to nearby Ephrata and other towns.

=== Airport ===
Larson Air Force Base, five miles from the city of Moses Lake, originally was named Moses Lake Army Air Base. It was activated on 24 November 1942 as a World War II training center. Major Donald A. Larson, for whom the base was later renamed, was from Yakima, Washington.

The Secretary of Defense announced on November 19, 1965, that Larson was to be closed by June of the following year. Larson Air Force Base, since renamed Grant County International Airport, is now a world-class heavy jet training and testing facility used by the Boeing Company, the U.S. military and NASA. The airport had hosted Japan's national carrier, Japan Airlines, from 1968 to 2008 for the training of its pilots, co-pilots, and flight engineers due to lack of runway space at airports in Japan to do touch and goes with jumbo jets. Columbia Pacific Aviation now handles charter passenger service to and from Moses Lake. With 4,700 acres (1,900 ha) and a main runway 13,500 feet (4,110 m) long, it is one of the largest airports in the United States.

Moses Lake is also served by the much smaller municipal airport, which has one runway.

== Education ==
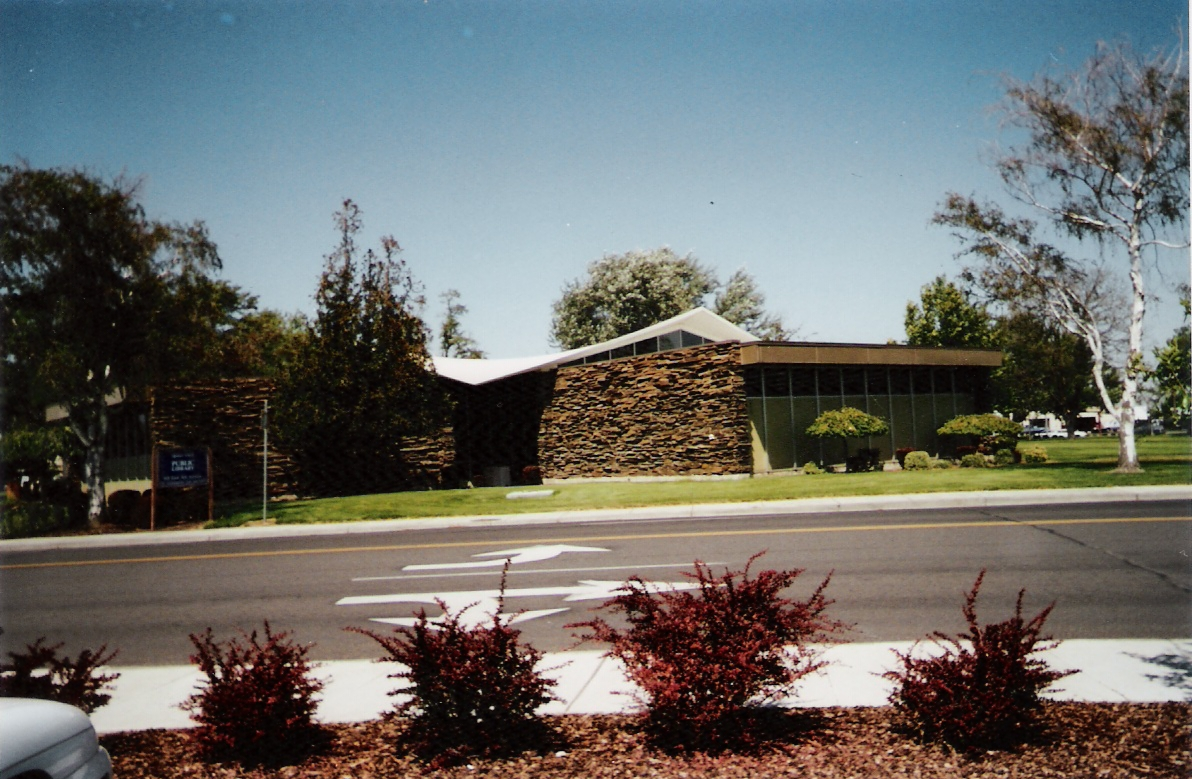
Moses Lake Public Library, showing its distinctive hyperbolic-paraboloid roof

Public education in the city is provided by the Moses Lake School District.

=== Schools ===
Elementary schools

- Garden Heights Elementary
- Groff Elementary
- Knolls Vista Elementary
- Lakeview Terrace Elementary
- Larson Heights Elementary
- Longview Elementary
- Midway Elementary
- North Elementary
- Peninsula Elementary
- Park Orchard Elementary
- Sage Point Elementary

Public middle schools

- Frontier Middle School
- Columbia Middle School (formerly Chief Moses Middle School)
- Endeavor Middle School (formerly Columbia Basin Secondary School)

Public high schools

- Moses Lake High School
- Vanguard Academy
- Digital Learning Center
- Columbia Basin Technical Skills Center (CBTech)

Private schools

- AIM School and Gymnastics (Kindergarten and 1st Grade)
- Glenn J. Kimber Academy
- Moses Lake Christian Academy
- Crest View Christian School
- Covenant Christian School

Learning centers

- Family Services of Grant County / Head Start
- Skillsource
- Columbia Basin Job Corps Civilian Conservation Center

The Japanese Supplementary School of Moses Lake (モーゼスレイク補習授業校 Mōzesu Reiku Hoshū Jugyō Kō), a weekend Japanese educational program, previously operated in Moses Lake.

==== Colleges ====
- Big Bend Community College

=== 1996 Frontier Middle School shooting ===
On February 2, 1996, Frontier Middle School was the site of a school shooting. The gunman, 14-year-old Barry Dale Loukaitis, killed his algebra teacher and two students, and held his classmates hostage before a gym coach subdued him.

== Events and recreation ==
- Spring Festival (Memorial Day weekend)
- Moses Lake Water Sports Festival (June) (first held in June 2008)
- Brews and Tunes (First held in February 2018)

Lion's Field, located in downtown near Frontier Middle School, was remodeled after a voter-approved levy. The high school football team opened the completed stadium on September 12, 2008.

The Moses Lake Sand Dunes are open year-round to 4x4 and ORV enthusiasts.

== Sister cities ==
Moses Lake has one sister city: Yonezawa, Japan. On August 7, 1978, the mayor of Moses Lake, Bob Hill, wrote a letter to Mayor Toshihide Cho of Yonezawa City, inviting Yonezawa to become a "Sister City" to Moses Lake. The 1981 group to visit Yonezawa City in May became the "Official Delegation" since it was during this visit that the "Sister City Agreement" between Yonezawa City and Moses Lake was signed by Mayor Bob Hill and Mayor Toshihide Cho on May 1, 1981. As part of the program, a small group of high school students from both cities are invited to take part in a cultural exchange. Since its inception, over 200 students and their family members from these two communities have taken part in this exchange. The two cities continue to exchange students every summer since 1981 and marked the 40th anniversary of this program on May 1, 2021.

There is a street named after Yonezawa in Moses Lake and a street named after Moses Lake in Yonezawa. The large hawk statue located on the west end of Yonezawa Boulevard is called an Otaka Poppo. These wood carvings, known as sasano bori, are special wood carvings unique to Yonezawa. These wooden dolls have been given as gifts to Moses Lake residents can be found on display around the city and on the campus of Big Bend Community College. Japanese lanterns, some which are gifts from citizens of Yonezawa, can be found around Moses Lake on Yonezawa Boulevard and inside the Japanese Garden.

== Notable people ==
- T. R. Bryden, MLB pitcher
- Jason Buck, NFL defensive lineman
- Matt Cedeño, actor
- Ryan Doumit, MLB catcher
- Sid Eudy, Professional wrestler
- Pierson Fodé, actor
- Clarence Gilyard, actor who performed on Matlock and Walker, Texas Ranger
- Dave Heaverlo, MLB pitcher
- Rachell "Rae" Hofstetter, American Internet personality
- Joe Hooper, Medal of Honor recipient in Vietnam
- Reid Stowe, sailor and adventurer
- Martha Thomsen – Model – Born in Moses Lake
- Kirk A. Triplett, PGA golfer
- Joseph J. Tyson, Roman Catholic bishop of Yakima diocese
- Bryan Warrick, NBA player
- Blaine Harden, author and journalist
