= Robert O. Tyler =

United States Army brigadier general (1831–1874)

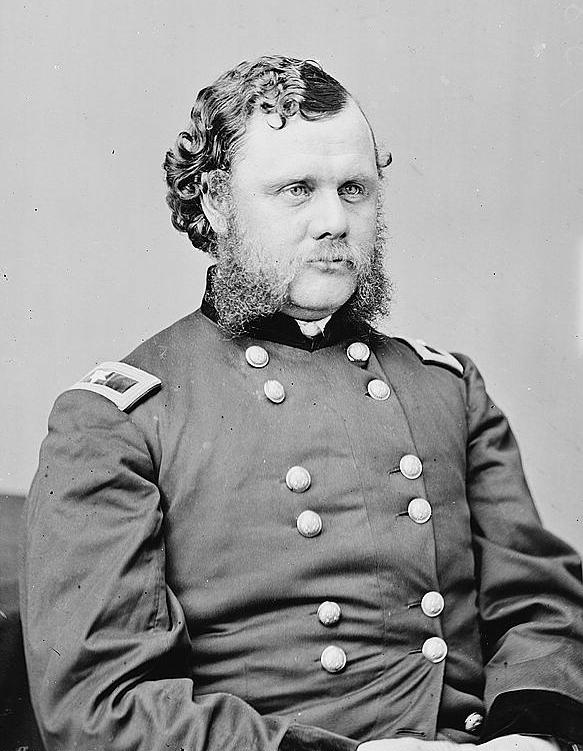
- Robert O. Tyler
- Born: December 31, 1831; Hunter, New York
- Died: December 1, 1874 (aged 42); Boston, Massachusetts
- Burial place: Cedar Hill Cemetery, Hartford, Connecticut
- Military career
- Allegiance: United States of America; Union
- Branch: United States Army; Union Army
- Service years: 1853–1874
- Rank: Brigadier General; Brevet Major General
- Commands: Artillery Reserve, Army of the Potomac; 4th Division, II Corps
- Conflicts: Yakima War; Coeur d'Alene War; Battle of Four Lakes; Battle of Spokane Plains; Utah War; American Civil War; Peninsula Campaign; Battle of Fredericksburg; Battle of Chancellorsville; Battle of Gettysburg; Battle of Spotsylvania Court House; Battle of Cold Harbor
- Other work: author

Robert Ogden Tyler (December 31, 1831 – December 1, 1874) was an American military officer in the Union army during the American Civil War. He graduated from the United States Military Academy in 1853 and served in the United States Army during the Yakima War and the Utah War. He commanded the Artillery Reserve in the Army of the Potomac at the Battle of Gettysburg in July 1863, where his artillery batteries played an important role in the Union victory. Tyler also led a division of heavy artillery turned infantry during the Overland Campaign in 1864. He was severely wounded at the Battle of Cold Harbor and served in administrative duties for the remainder of the war.

== Early life and education ==
Tyler was born in Hunter, New York, to Frederick and Sophia (née Sharp) Tyler. He moved with his family to Hartford, Connecticut when he was 7 years old. He was a nephew of Daniel Tyler, who also served as a general in the Civil War. He received an appointment to the United States Military Academy in West Point, New York, and graduated 22nd of 52 cadets in the Class of 1853.

== Military career ==
=== Early career ===
He received a brevet appointment as a second lieutenant and was assigned to the artillery. In the Spring of 1854, he served under Colonel Edward Steptoe and was stationed at the Presidio in San Francisco, California. In 1855, he was stationed at Fort Vancouver and Fort Dalles where he fought in the Yakima War. He was promoted to First Lieutenant on September 1, 1855.

Tyler served as an artilleryman in the Utah Territory during the Utah War and was among the U.S. Army officers who signed a petition supporting the reappointment of the controversial Mormon leader Brigham Young as governor.

In 1858, he fought in the Coeur d'Alene War in the Battle of Four Lakes and the Battle of Spokane Plains. In 1859, he served under Thomas W. Sherman at Fort Ridgely in Minnesota. He returned East in 1860 and served at Fort Columbus Recruiting Depot in New York until the outbreak of the Civil War.

=== American Civil War ===
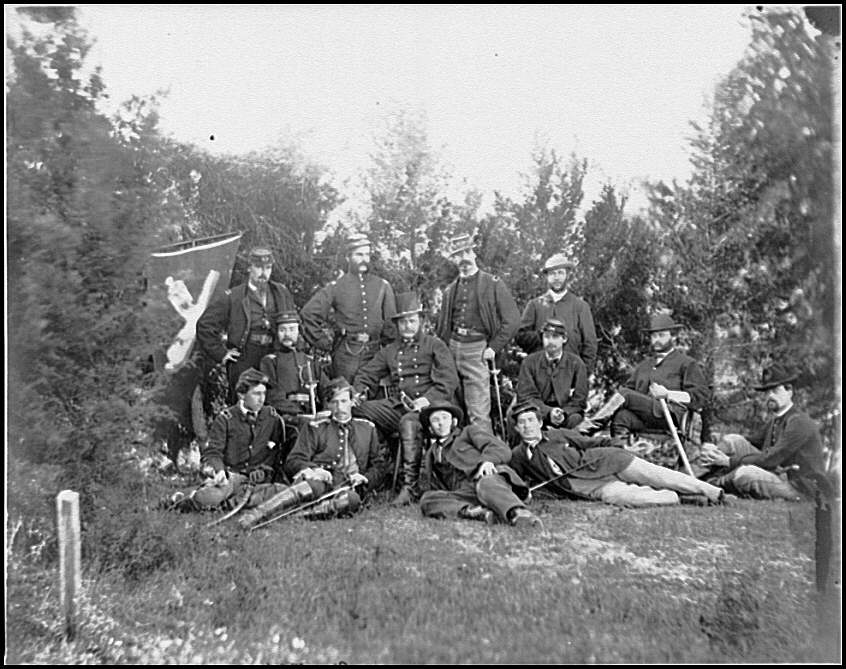
General Tyler and Artillery Reserve staff in Culpeper, Virginia

During the April 1861 crisis at Fort Sumter in Charleston, South Carolina, Tyler was part of a hastily assembled relief force that tried unsuccessfully to reinforce the beleaguered garrison. He was promoted to captain on May 17, 1861 and ordered to Alexandria, Virginia to set up supply depots for the Union forces in Virginia and Washington, D.C.. On September 17, 1861 he was appointed colonel of the 4th Connecticut Infantry. Tyler began training the men as artillerymen, and the regiment was renamed the 1st Connecticut Heavy Artillery on January 2, 1862.

The regiment served in the Peninsula Campaign, and Tyler commanded the siege train of the Army of the Potomac under Maj. Gen. George B. McClellan. He received commendations for his participation in the Battle of Hanover Court House, the Battle of Gaines' Mill and the Battle of Malvern Hill. On November 29, 1862, Tyler was promoted to brigadier general of volunteers and under General Ambrose Burnside was assigned command of all the artillery in the "Center Grand Division" of the army. He was the second officer in the artillery to hold that position, the other being Henry Jackson Hunt. His guns participated in the Battle of Fredericksburg, providing artillery support for the series of assaults on Confederate positions on the heights near Fredericksburg.

Maj. Gen. Joseph Hooker assumed command of the Army of the Potomac and reorganized it, creating a formal Artillery Reserve under Tyler's command. The reserve was expanded to five brigades and 118 guns. Tyler commanded the reserve during the battles of Chancellorsville and Gettysburg, where many of his guns were used to help repel Confederate attacks on Union positions such as Cemetery Ridge and Cemetery Hill, as well as during Pickett's Charge on July 3. During the battle, he had two horses shot from under him. Tyler was disabled by sun stroke during part of the Gettysburg campaign. In the Fall of 1863, Tyler also participated in the Bristoe and Mine Run campaigns, but played no major role.

In early 1864, Tyler was assigned command of a division of infantry consisting entirely of heavy artillery regiments, which he led at Harris Farm in the Battle of Spotsylvania Court House, where it was attached to II Corps. He then led a brigade in 2nd Division, II Corps, at the Battle of Cold Harbor and was severely wounded by a bullet in his ankle which incapacitated him from any further field duty during the war. After a 6 month recovery, Tyler served in an administrative role in command of the District of Delaware and the Eastern Shore with his headquarters in Philadelphia.

=== Post-Civil War ===
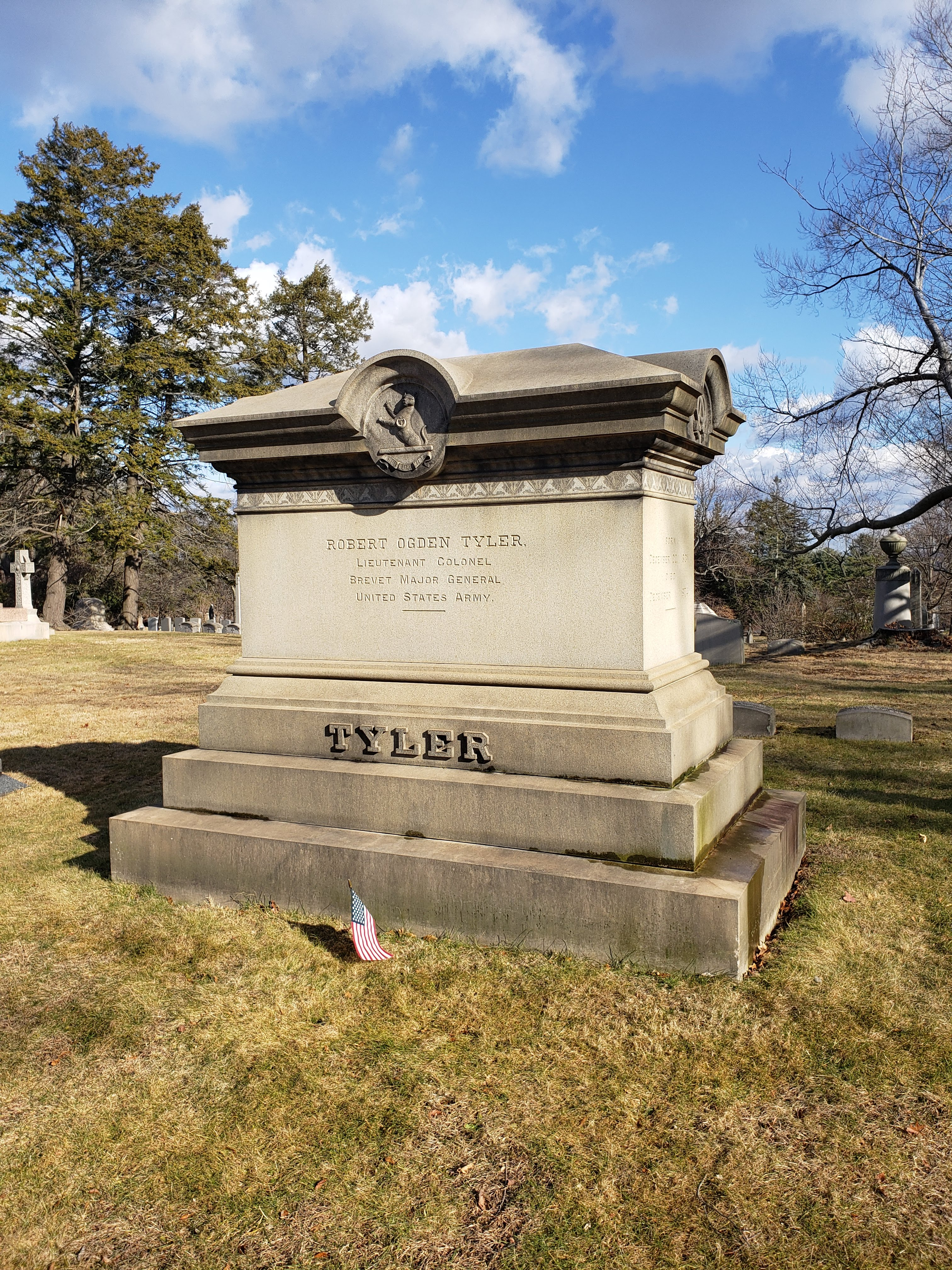
Robert Ogden Tyler memorial in Cedar Hill Cemetery

At the close of the war, the War Department rewarded scores of officers with brevet promotions dating from March 1865. Tyler received the brevet rank of major general of volunteers for "great gallantry at the Battle of Cold Harbor". In 1866 he mustered out of volunteer service and was commissioned as a lieutenant colonel in the regular army, serving as deputy Quartermaster General in several locations.

== Death and legacy ==
His wartime injuries contributed to his declining health, and Tyler died in Boston, Massachusetts, at the age of 42. He is buried in Cedar Hill Cemetery in Hartford. Before he died, he was able to complete his autobiography, the Memoir of Brevet Major-General Robert Ogden Tyler (Philadelphia: J.B. Lippincott, 1878).

The Robert O. Tyler Post #50 of the Grand Army of the Republic in Hartford was named in his honor.

== Bibliography ==
- Memoir of Brevet Major-General Robert Ogden Tyler, J.B. Lippincott & Co., Philadelphia, 1878

== See also ==
- List of American Civil War generals (Union)
