= Steptoe =

Steptoe or Stepto may refer to:

== People ==
- Amanda Stepto (born 1970), Canadian actress
- Andrew Steptoe (born 1951), British psychologist and epidemiologist, University College London
- Edward Steptoe (1815–1865), officer in the United States Army in the Mexican-American War and the Indian Wars
- George Steptoe Washington (1771–1809), planter, militia officer and nephew of the first US President George Washington
- James Steptoe Johnston (1843–1924), American Confederate veteran, preacher and educator
- Javaka Steptoe, American author and illustrator, winner of the 2017 Caldecott Medal
- John Steptoe (1950–1989), author and illustrator for children’s books dealing with the African-American experience
- Lamont B. Steptoe (born 1949), American poet, photographer and publisher
- Lydia Steptoe, pen-name of Djuna Barnes (1892–1982), American writer and artist known for her novel Nightwood (1936)
- Patrick Steptoe CBE FRS (1913–1988), British obstetrician, gynaecologist and a pioneer of fertility treatment
- Roger Steptoe (born 1953), English composer and pianist
- Nickname for Stephen Toulouse, the former director of Xbox LIVE Policy and Enforcement at Microsoft
- Syndric Steptoe (born 1984), former gridiron football wide receiver

== Places ==
- Steptoe Butte, quartzite island in Whitman County, Washington, in the northwest United States
- Steptoe and Kamiak Buttes, 1,144-acre (463 ha) National Natural Landmark in Whitman County, Washington, designated in 1965
- Steptoe Battlefield State Park, three-acre (1.2 ha) heritage site on the southeast side of Rosalia in Whitman County, Washington
- Steptoe Valley, long basin located in White Pine County, in northeastern Nevada in the western United States
- Steptoe, Washington, small unincorporated rural town in Whitman County, Washington, United States

== Other ==
- Steptoe Disaster (Battle of Pine Creek), a conflict between United States Army forces and members of Native American tribes
- Steptoe & Johnson, international law firm headquartered in Washington, D.C.
- Steptoe and Son, British television sitcom about a father-and-son rag-and-bone business
- Steptoe and Son (film), 1972 British comedy drama film and a spin-off from the television sitcom

== See also ==
- The Curse of Steptoe, television play first broadcast in 2008 on BBC Four
- John Steptoe Award for New Talent, annual award presented by the Ethnic & Multicultural Information Exchange Round Table
- Stepstone
