= Battle of Spokane Plains =

1858 battle fought in Washington

- Part of the Coeur d'Alene War, Yakima War
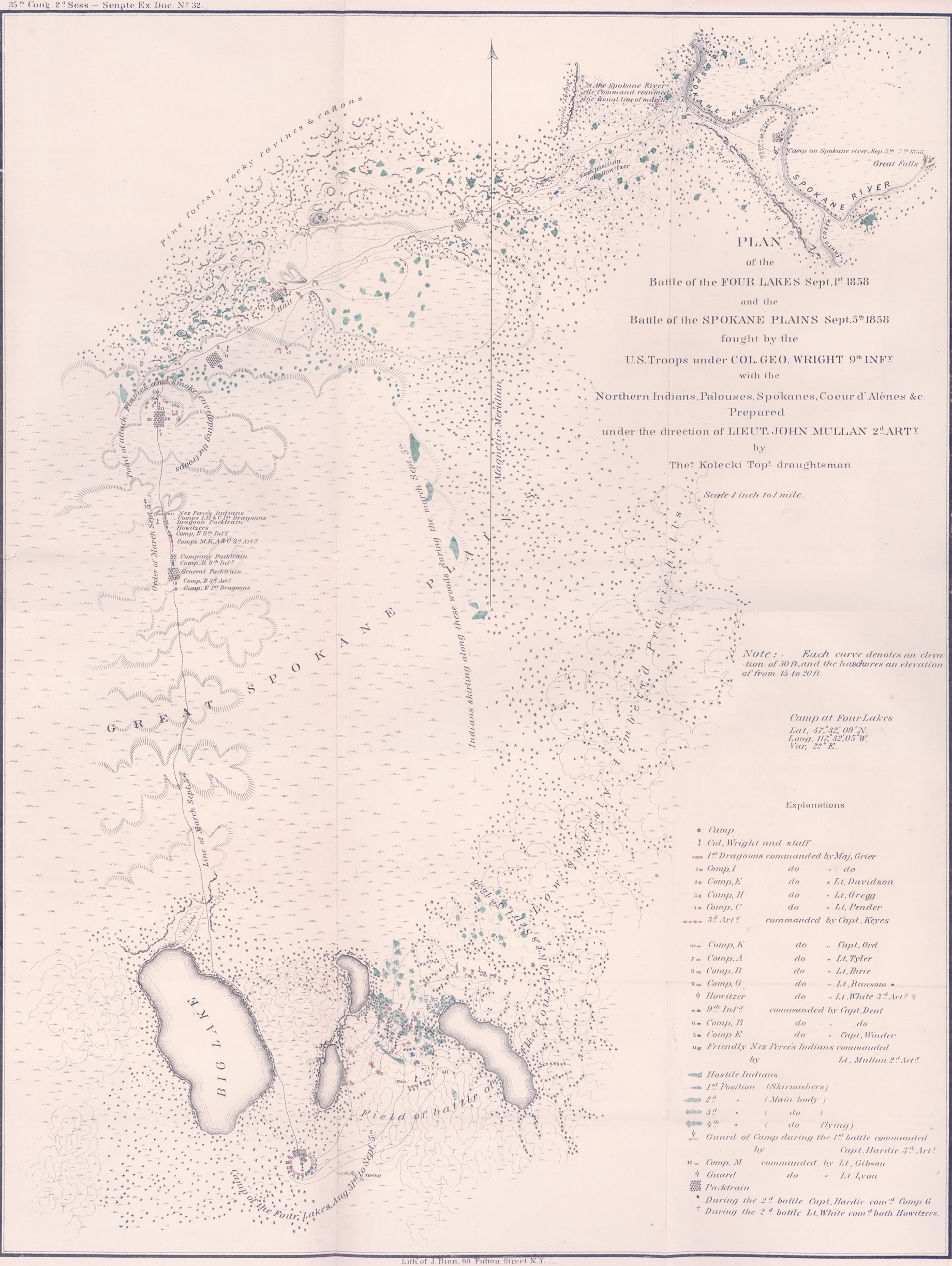
- Map showing the Battle of Four Lakes and the Battle of Spokane Plains
Date	September 5, 1858
Location	near modern-day Fort George Wright near Spokane, Washington 47.677867°N 117.475915°W
Result	United States victory

Belligerents
United States	Kalispel; Palus; Schitsu'umsh (Coeur d'Alene); Spokan; Yakama

Commanders and leaders
George Wright	Kamiakin

Strength
~700 (including 200 civilian drovers)	~500 to 700

Casualties and losses
1 (wounded)	6 (dead) unknown wounded

The Battle of Spokane Plains was a battle during the Coeur d'Alene War of 1858 in the Washington Territory (now the states of Washington and Idaho) in the United States. The Coeur d'Alene War was part of the Yakima War, which began in 1855. The battle was fought west of Fort George Wright near Spokane, Washington, between elements of the United States Army and a coalition of Native American tribes consisting of Kalispel (Pend Oreille), Palus, Schitsu'umsh (Coeur d'Alene), Spokan, and Yakama warriors.

== Battle ==
Although their lands were protected by treaty, the Schitsu'umsh were outraged by miners and illegal white settlers invading their territory. They also perceived the Mullan Road, whose construction had just begun near Fort Dalles, as a precursor to a land grab by the United States. Two white miners were killed, and the U.S. Army retaliated. The Coeur d'Alene War (the last part of the larger Yakima War) began with the Battle of Pine Creek (near present-day Rosalia, Washington) on May 17, 1858, during which a column of 164 U.S. Army infantry and cavalry under the command of brevet Lieutenant Colonel Edward Steptoe was routed by a group composed primarily of Cayuse, Schitsu'umsh, Spokan, and Yakama warriors.

Following Steptoe's defeat, Colonel George Wright, commander of Fort Dalles, led a much larger unit of 500 Army soldiers, 200 civilian drovers, and 30 Niimíipu (or Nez Perce) scouts to nearby Fort Walla Walla and then north to the Spokane Plains (near modern-day Spokane, Washington). On September 1, 1858, Wright's men defeated the Yakama chief Kamiakin and a force of about 500 Schitsu'umsh, Palus, Spokane, and Yakama warriors in the Battle of Four Lakes. Wright rested for three days, and at 6:30 A.M. on September 5 moved out again to the north.

Wright's column had moved about 5 miles (8.0 km) north and emerged onto the Spokane Plains when the reformed group of 500 to 700 Kalispel, Palus, Schitsu'umsh, Spokan, and Yakama warriors began attacking again. The Indians harassed the troop by racing toward the column, firing, and speeding away before the soldiers could respond. Wright headed for a small forest about 9 miles (14 km) further to the north. As the Army troop reached the forest (about the modern-day intersection of W. Deno Road and N. Craig Road), the Native Americans set fire to the prairie all around them. As thick smoke surrounded the soldiers, the Native Americans attempted to drive off the Army pack train. The infantry fired and drove them into the woods, where Wright fired his two 12-pounder howitzers and two 6-pounder guns at them. Although Wright's infantry were armed with the new Springfield Model 1855 rifle-musket (which had a range of 1,000 yards (910 m)). Native American horsemen used the smoke to cover their approach, effectively negating the guns' longer range.

Wright now turned east-northeast to the Spokane River where, with the water at his back, he could more effectively concentrate his fire and protect his men. After moving about 2.5 miles (4.0 km), Wright temporarily halted his column to allow the pack train to close up. The troop moved out again. To clear the way, Wright ordered his 30 Niimíipu (or Nez Perce) scouts, led by 1st Lt. John Mullan, to race slightly ahead and scout out the land to ensure the column was moving in the right direction. Then three companies of Wright's best marksmen moved forward in a skirmish line to the front and right, breaking up the Indian attacks. They were followed by Wright's cavalry, which charged into the enemy lines and scattered the warriors. Whenever Native Americans attempted to regroup in the forest to Wright's left, the howitzers, and cannons would rake the trees. Kamiakin himself was wounded when a shattered tree limb fell on him.

By nightfall, the Army column had reached the river, and the Native American combatants had scattered. Only a single soldier had been slightly injured, even though the column had come 25 miles (40 km) through a near-constant barrage of gunfire. At least six Native Americans were confirmed dead, and three were wounded (although the number of wounded was undoubtedly much higher).

Kamiakin had twice assembled a large coalition of warriors from disparate tribes, a feat historian Keith Petersen has noted, which has gone underappreciated for more than a century. He did so the second time despite having been defeated three days earlier. Moreover, until Wright began using his skirmish line and sending out cavalry charges, Kamiakin's forces had come exceedingly close to defeating the professional soldiers through prairie fire, confusion, and hit-and-run tactics. Nevertheless, the Army victory at Spokane Plains shattered Kamiakin's alliance, effectively ending the Coeur d'Alene War. On September 17, the Schitsu'umsh chiefs signed a document of surrender.

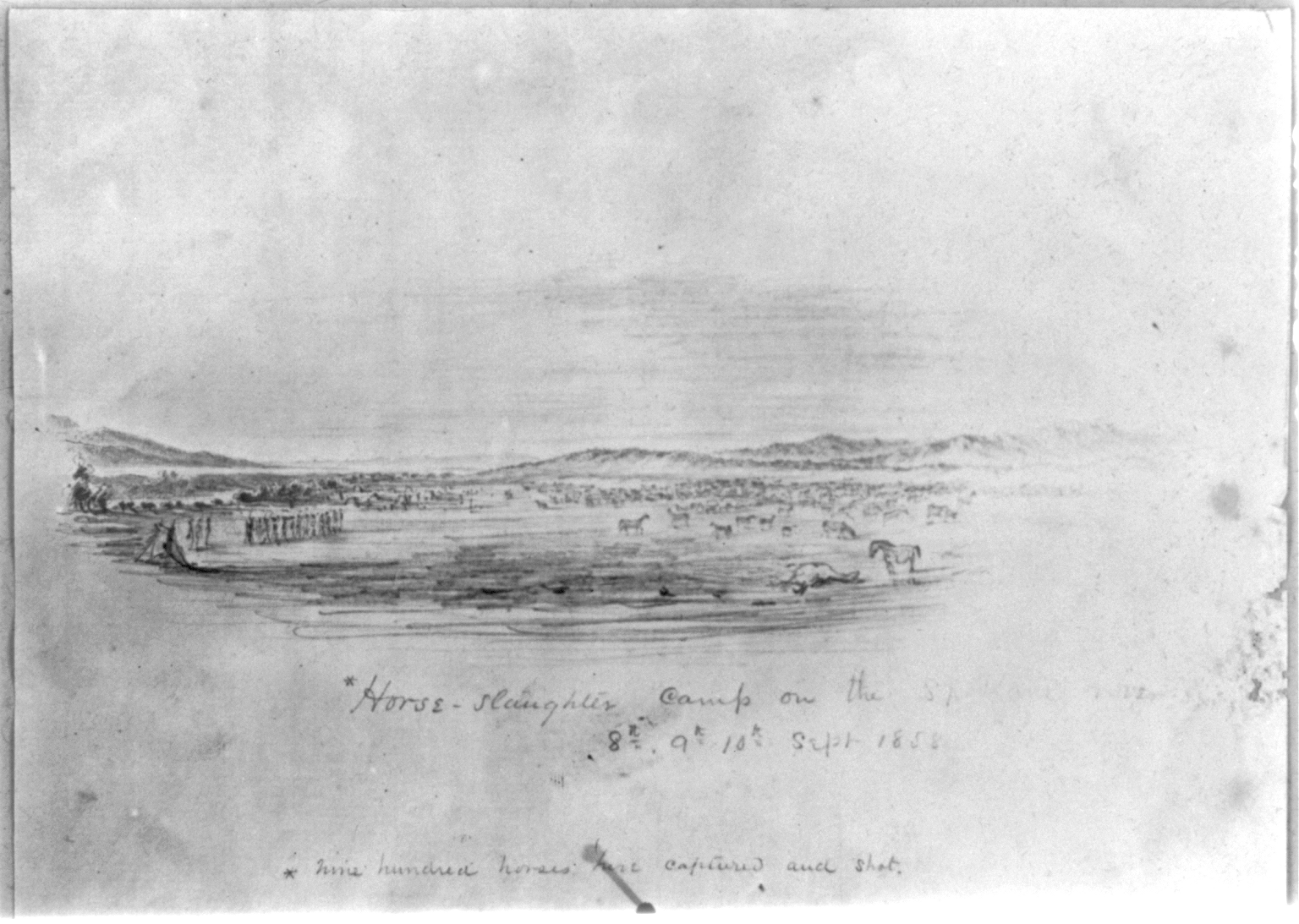
Horse-slaughter camp on the Spokane River

=== Horse slaughter ===
In retaliation for the uprising, between 9 and 10 September 1858, soldiers commanded by Col. George Wright captured a herd of nearly 1,000 Indian horses that were being guarded by tribal elders and children attempting to drive them to safety. The animals were killed initially one by one, and then by gunshot volleys. Numbers of horses killed vary between 600 and 900 animals. The horse killings ensured the tribes would have difficulty hunting and faring for themselves over the winter, as well as would prevent further uprisings.

Wright later spoke of his actions,

"I deeply regretted killing these poor creatures, but a dire necessity drove me to it...The chastisement which these Indians have received has been severe but well merited and absolutely necessary to impress them with our power. … A blow has been struck which they will never forget.”

In 1946 a commemorative obelisk was installed at the site of the horse killings. In 2018 on the 160th anniversary of the horse killings, a healing ceremony was held to commemorate the event.

== See also ==
- Battle of Palo Duro Canyon, 1874 Army battle where 1,500-2,000 Indian horses were killed in retaliation

== Bibliography ==
- Berhow, Mark A. (2012). Forlorn Confederacy: The Native Wars in the Washington Territory, 1855-1858. Peoria, Ill.: Cosmoline Press. ISBN 9781312303935.
- Frey, Rodney (2001). Landscape Traveled by Coyote and Crane: The World of the Schitsu'umsh (Coeur d'Alene Indians). Seattle: University of Washington Press. ISBN 9780295801629.
- Glassley, Ray Hoard (1953). Pacific Northwest Indian Wars: The Cayuse War of 1848, the Rogue River Wars of the '50s, the Yakima War, 1853-56, the Coeur D'Alene War, 1857, the Modoc War, 1873, the Nez Perce War, 1877, the Bannock War, 1878, the Sheepeater's War of 1879. Portland, Ore.: Binfords & Mort.
- Josephy, Alvin M. (1997). The Nez Perce Indians and the Opening of the Northwest. Boston: Houghton Mifflin. ISBN 9780395850114.
- Manring, Benjamin Franklin (1912). The Conquest of the Coeur d'Alenes, Spokanes and Palouses: The Expeditions of Colonels E.J. Steptoe and George Wright Against the "Northern Indians" in 1858. Spokane, Wash.: Inland Print. Co.
- McDonald, Eric V.; Bullard, T.F. (2016). Military Geosciences and Desert Warfare: Past Lessons and Modern Challenges. New York: Springer. ISBN 9781493934270.
- McFarland, Ronald E. (2016). Edward J. Steptoe and the Indian Wars: Life on the Frontier, 1815-1865. Jefferson, N.C.: McFarland & Company. ISBN 9781476662329.
- Petersen, Keith (2014). John Mullan: The Tumultuous Life of a Western Road Builder. Pullman, Wash.: Washington State University Press. ISBN 9780874223217.
