= Latah, Washington =

- Town
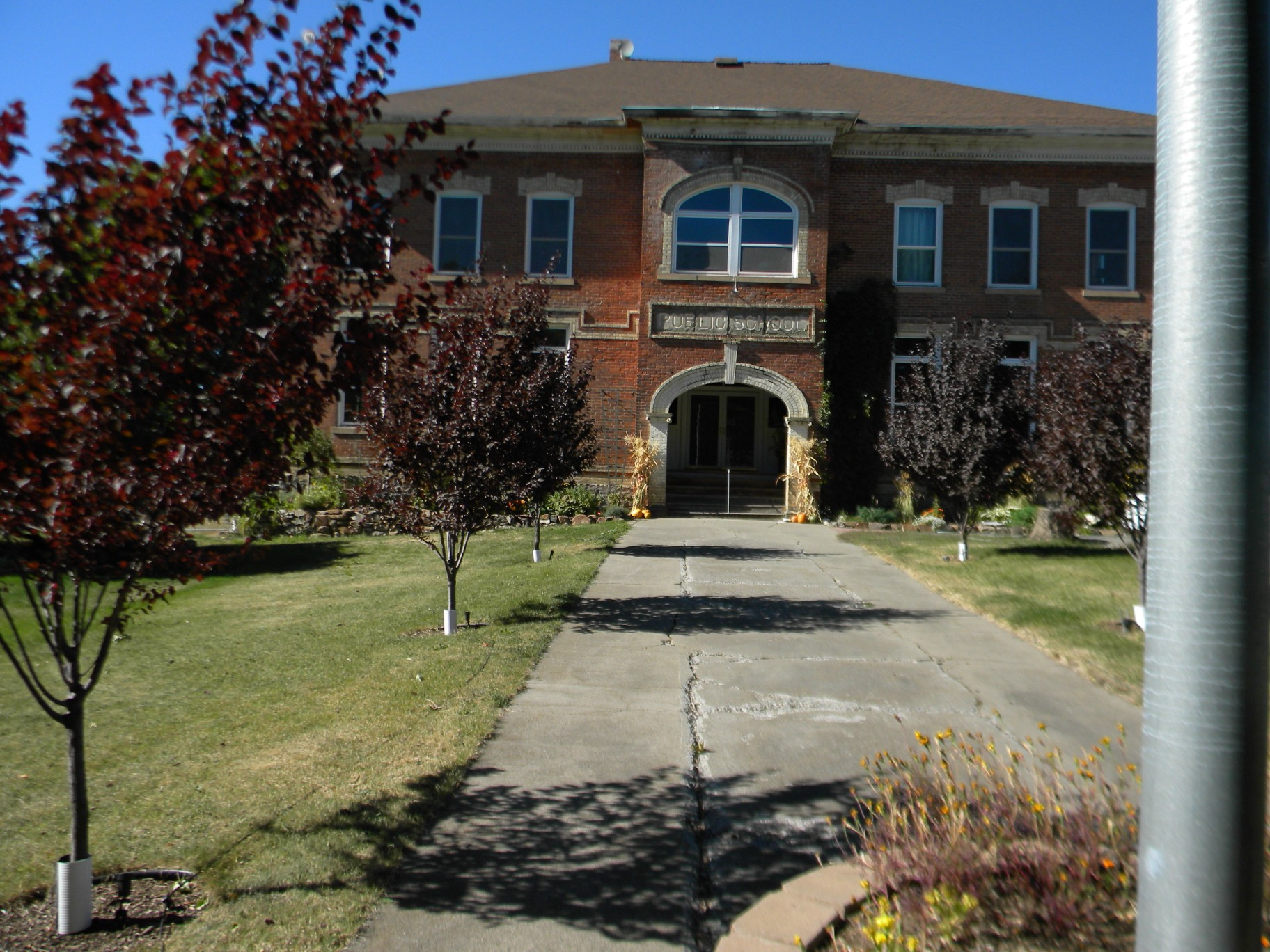
- Historic Latah School

- Location of Latah, Washington
- Coordinates: 47°16′54″N 117°9′24″W
- Country: United States
- State: Washington
- County: Spokane

Government
  - Type: Mayor–council
  - Mayor: Corinna Rittgarn

Area
  - Total: 0.32 sq mi (0.83 km^{2})
  - Land: 0.32 sq mi (0.83 km^{2})
  - Water: 0 sq mi (0.00 km^{2})
- Elevation: 2,520 ft (770 m)

Population (2020)
  - Total: 185
  - Density: 580/sq mi (220/km^{2})
- Time zone: UTC-8 (Pacific (PST))
  - Summer (DST): UTC-7 (PDT)
- ZIP code: 99018
- Area code: 509
- FIPS code: 53-38495
- GNIS feature ID: 2412879

Latah is a town in Spokane County, Washington, United States. The population was 185 at the 2020 census. It was named for the nearby creek, Latah Creek, from the native word for fish. The town was formerly called, Hangman's Creek and Alpha.

== History ==
Latah Valley saw its first wave of settlers about 1872, which included Richard and Lydia Wimpy family, Hosea and Harriette Harvey family, and Henry and Julia Coplan family. In those days, the settlement took the name of the nearby stream, Hangman's Creek. The stream received its name from the tragic events of 1858, when Col. George Wright hanged several members of the local native tribes in retaliation for the defeat of Lt. Col. Edward J. Steptoe at the Battle of Pine Creek. The exact jurisdiction seems to have been of question in the beginning, as the first postmaster of "Hangman's Creek" was Richard H Wimpy, appointed March 19, 1873, in Nez Perce County, Idaho. The post office was transferred to Stevens County, Washington Territory, on May 5, 1873, with R. H. Wimpy still the postmaster. That section of Stevens County became Whitman County, and finally Spokane County. Meanwhile, Hangman's Creek changed to "Alpha" on April 25, 1881, under postmaster Emery H. Averill, so named because it was the first settlement in the area. Alpha changed to "Latah", on December 11, 1883, under postmaster David T. Ham, again naming it after the nearby stream, Latah Creek. The legislature had decided to rename the stream Latah, from the native word "lahtoo," which means "stream where little fish are caught."

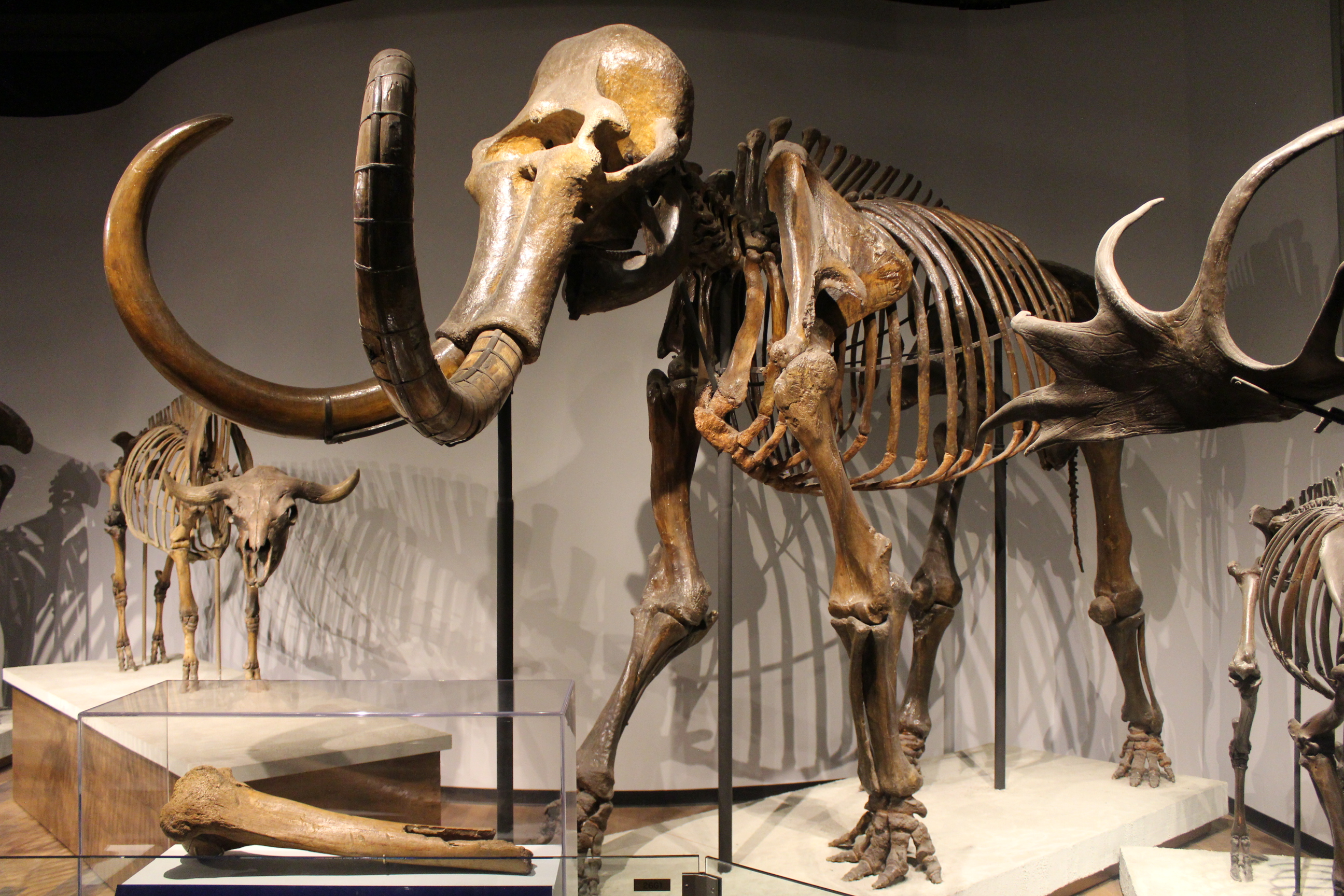
Coplan brothers Mammuthus primigenius skeleton on display at the Field Museum of Natural History.

This small farming community gained some fame a few years after the settlers arrived. The eldest sons of Henry Coplan/Copeland arrived in 1872, followed by the rest of the family in 1873. In May 1876, the Coplan brothers were examining a boggy piece of land near the creek when they discovered mammoth fossils, along with a collection of other animal fossils, and evidence of prehistoric human activity. The news attracted visitors and scientists to the area, and inspired another set of brothers, William and Thomas Donahoe, to search their own property on Pine Creek. The Donahoe brothers found a gargantuan mammoth skull and other fossils. After extracting a sizable collection, the Coplan brothers, Ben, Alonzo, and Lewis, took their prizes on tour through Washington, Idaho, and Oregon. The Donahoe brothers sent theirs on tour to California. After passing through various other hands, the Donahoe collection was acquired by the American Museum of Natural History in New York City, where it still resides. The Coplan collection eventually came into the possession of the Field Museum of Natural History in Chicago where it remains.

Latah was officially incorporated on April 9, 1892, with Ben Coplan appointed as the first mayor in 1893. Ben's famous mammoth served as the centerpiece of the Washington Pavilion at Chicago's World Columbian Exposition of 1893.

== Geography ==
According to the United States Census Bureau, the town has a total area of 0.31 square miles (0.80 km^{2}), all of it land.

== Demographics ==
Historical population
Census	Pop.	Note	%±
1890	232		—
1900	253		9.1%
1910	339		34.0%
1920	330		−2.7%
1930	284		−13.9%
1940	270		−4.9%
1950	244		−9.6%
1960	190		−22.1%
1970	169		−11.1%
1980	155		−8.3%
1990	175		12.9%
2000	151		−13.7%
2010	183		21.2%
2020	185		1.1%
U.S. Decennial Census; 2015 Estimate

=== 2010 census ===
As of the 2010 census, there were 183 people, 67 households, and 50 families living in the town. The population density was 590.3 inhabitants per square mile (227.9/km^{2}). There were 81 housing units at an average density of 261.3 per square mile (100.9/km^{2}). The racial makeup of the town was 88.5% White, 2.7% Native American, 0.5% Asian, 0.5% from other races, and 7.7% from two or more races. Hispanic or Latino of any race were 6.0% of the population.

There were 67 households, of which 37.3% had children under the age of 18 living with them, 64.2% were married couples living together, 9.0% had a female householder with no husband present, 1.5% had a male householder with no wife present, and 25.4% were non-families. 19.4% of all households were made up of individuals, and 6% had someone living alone who was 65 years of age or older. The average household size was 2.73 and the average family size was 3.22.

The median age in the town was 37.6 years. 27.9% of residents were under the age of 18; 5.5% were between the ages of 18 and 24; 25.2% were from 25 to 44; 32.8% were from 45 to 64; and 8.7% were 65 years of age or older. The gender makeup of the town was 45.4% male and 54.6% female.

=== 2000 census ===
As of the 2000 census, there were 151 people, 56 households, and 43 families living in the town. The population density was 451.9 people per square mile (176.7/km^{2}). There were 75 housing units at an average density of 224.5 per square mile (87.8/km^{2}). The racial makeup of the town was 97.35% White, 0.66% Native American, 0.66% Asian, 1.32% from other races. Hispanic or Latino of any race were 4.64% of the population.

There were 56 households, out of which 48.2% had children under the age of 18 living with them, 57.1% were married couples living together, 16.1% had a female householder with no husband present, and 23.2% were non-families. 19.6% of all households were made up of individuals, and 8.9% had someone living alone who was 65 years of age or older. The average household size was 2.70 and the average family size was 3.09.

In the town, the population was spread out, with 31.1% under the age of 18, 6.6% from 18 to 24, 31.1% from 25 to 44, 24.5% from 45 to 64, and 6.6% who were 65 years of age or older. The median age was 35 years. For every 100 females, there were 93.6 males. For every 100 females age 18 and over, there were 89.1 males.

The median income for a household in the town was $40,417, and the median income for a family was $43,750. Males had a median income of $41,500 versus $21,563 for females. The per capita income for the town was $16,823. About 14.3% of families and 13.2% of the population were below the poverty line, including 22.6% of those under the age of eighteen and none of those 65 or over.
