= Plaza, Washington =

Unincorporated community in Washington, United States

- Unincorporated community
- Location within Washington (state)
- Coordinates: 47°19′13″N 117°23′02″W
- Country: United States
- State: Washington
- County: Spokane
- Established: 1879
- Time zone: UTC-8 (Pacific (PST))
  - Summer (DST): UTC-7 (PDT)
- US: 99170
- Area code: 509
- GNIS feature ID: 1512567

Plaza is an unincorporated community in Spokane County, Washington, United States. Plaza is situated in a valley formed by Spangle Creek, located approximately 7 miles (11 km) north of Rosalia. U.S. Route 195, a major north–south highway in the Palouse region, ran through the settlement until it was relocated to a bypass in 1974. The highway now passes a couple hundred feet west of the settlement. There are no services in Plaza, and the community itself is only a few square blocks in size, but the grain elevators in town make it a landmark for drivers on the highway.

John Paulson Creek flows nearby.

== History ==
Plaza was founded by Robert Patterson, a former Pony Express rider who had operated throughout Washington Territory. He built a general store along the rail line that ran between Spokane and Colfax, and a small community of farmers and tradesmen cropped up around it. Agriculture was the primary industry, but goods and services were also made available to railway passengers.
