= Battle of Four Lakes =

1858 Coeur d'Alene War battle in Washington, US

- Part of the Coeur d'Alene War, Yakima War
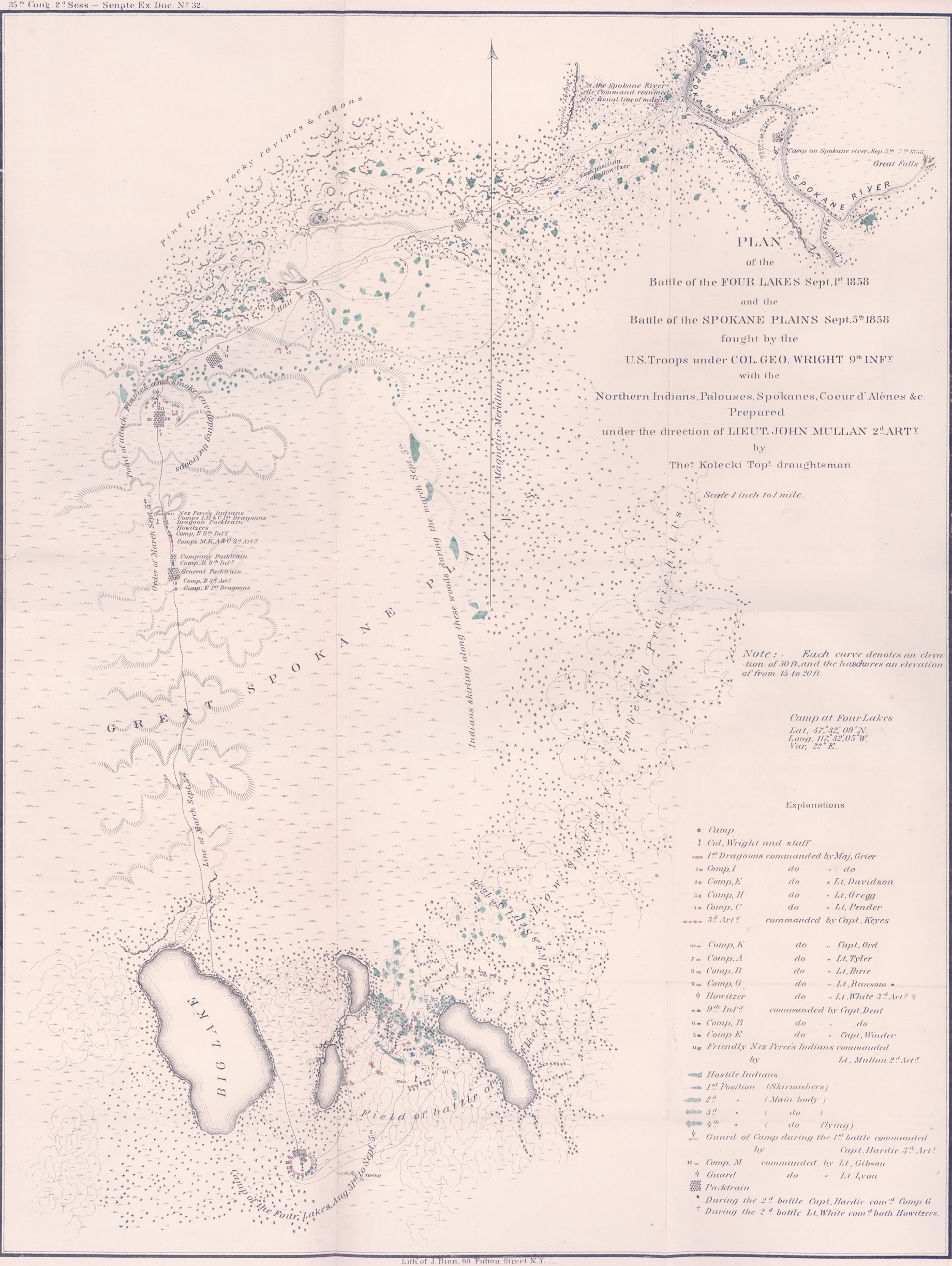
- Map showing the Battle of Four Lakes and the Battle of Spokane Plains
| Date | September 1, 1858 |
| Location | Near present day Four Lakes, Washington 47.550664°N 117.609874°W |
| Result | United States Tactical Victory - Indian Confederacy claims tactical retreat. |

Belligerents
| United States | Yakama; Palus; Spokan; Schitsu'umsh (Coeur d'Alene) |

Commanders and leaders
| (United States) George Wright | Kamiakin |

Strength
| ~700 (including 200 civilian drovers) | ~500 |

Casualties and losses
| 0 | 17 to 20 (George Wright's claim); unknown injured |

The Battle of Four Lakes was a battle during the Coeur d'Alene War of 1858 in the Washington Territory (now the states of Washington and Idaho) in the United States. The Coeur d'Alene War was part of the Yakima War, which began in 1855. The battle was fought near present-day Four Lakes, Washington, between elements of the United States Army and a coalition of Native American tribes consisting of Schitsu'umsh (Coeur d'Alene), Palus, Spokan, and Yakama warriors.

== Background ==
Schitsu'umsh lands were protected by treaty, and the tribe was outraged by miners and illegal white settlers invading their territory. They also perceived the Mullan Road, whose construction had just begun near Fort Dalles, as a precursor to a land-grab by the United States. Two white miners were killed, and the U.S. Army decided to retaliate. The Coeur d'Alene War (the last part of the larger Yakima War) began with the Battle of Pine Creek (near present-day Rosalia, Washington) on May 17, 1858, during which a column of 164 U.S. Army infantry and cavalry under the command of brevet Lieutenant Colonel Edward Steptoe was routed by a group composed primarily of Cayuse, Schitsu'umsh, Spokan, and Yakama warriors.

Following Steptoe's defeat, Colonel George Wright, commander of Fort Dalles, led a much larger unit of 500 Army soldiers, 200 civilian drovers, and 30 Niimíipu (or Nez Perce) scouts to nearby Fort Walla Walla and then north to the Spokane Plains (near modern-day Spokane, Washington). Wright's troops were armed with rebored 1841 Harpers Ferry Rifles. These had a range of 1,000 yards (910 m), more than 20 times the range of Steptoe's outdated guns. They also had five times the range of the weapons (bow and arrow and musket) used by the Native Americans. Wright's men also carried two 12-pounder howitzers and two 6-pounder field guns.

== Battle ==
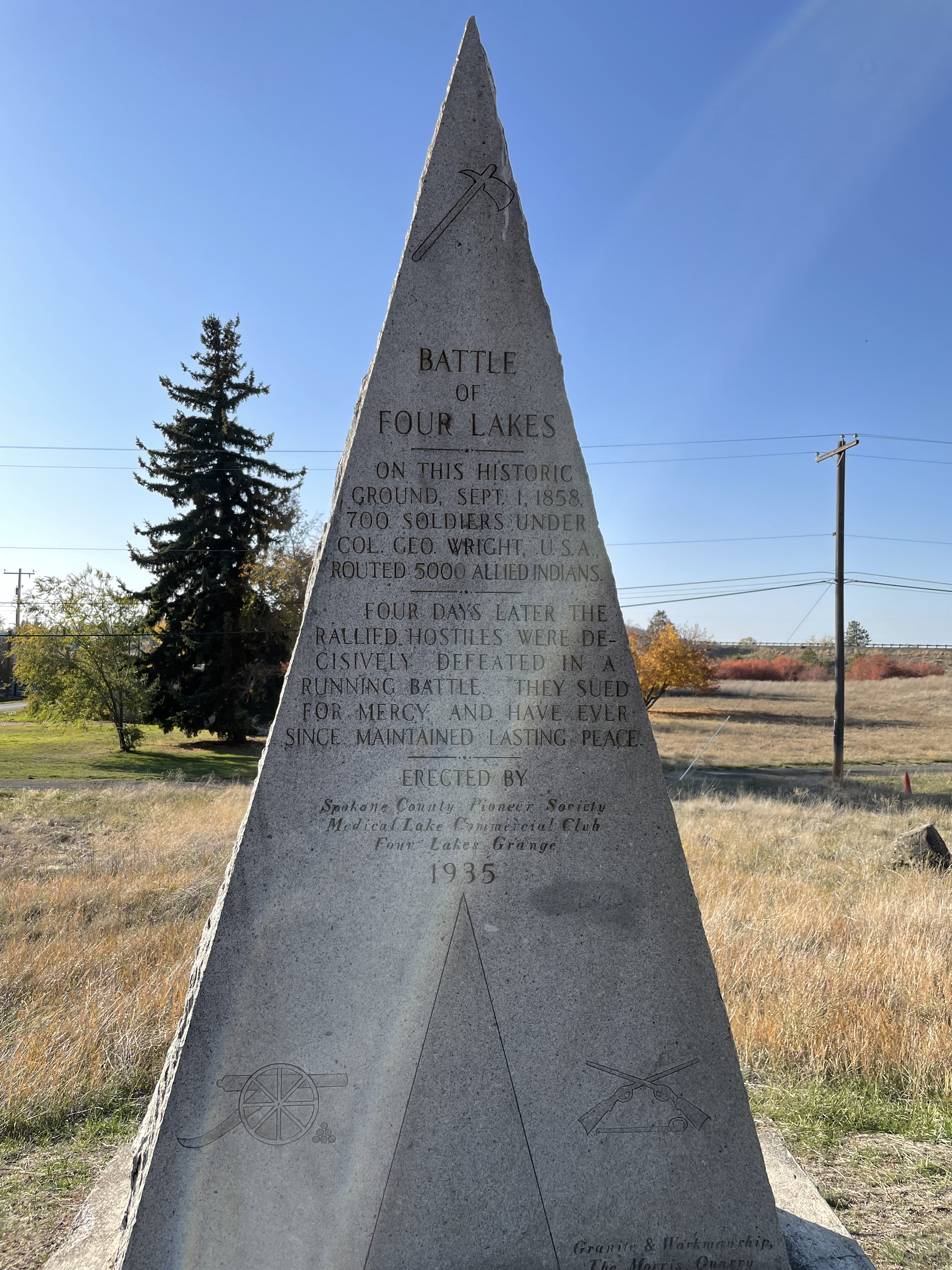
Four Lakes Monument

On September 1, 1858, Wright's men woke at dawn to discover a large group of Indians atop an east-west trending ridge about 2 miles (3.2 km) north-northwest of Wright's camp that connected Meadow Lake in the east and Granite Lake/Willow Lake in the west. The Native Americans, who numbered about 500 in total, planned to lure Wright's cavalry over the ridge and onto the plains beyond, where their faster mounts and superior horsemanship would enable them to wipe out the mounted soldiers. This would leave Wright's infantry stranded, incapable of resupply and thus easy prey. Chief Kamiakin occupied the center with Palus and Yakama. On the Indian left were Kamiakin's nephew, Qualchan, with additional Yakamas, and Stellam, a chief of the Schitsu'umsh, with warriors of his tribe. On the right were the Spokan chief Polatkin and members of his tribe.

Wright attacked with a group of 30 Niimíipu led by 1st Lt. John Mullan, who swept far to the right and then behind the ridge, forcing the Indians atop it to withdraw. Wright then sent his infantry up and over the ridge. The infantry line stopped 600 yards (550 m) from the Native American forces, who (based on their previous experience with Steptoe) believed themselves safely out of range. The infantry opened fire, killing a number of Native Americans and scattering most of them. Then Wright's cavalry sped around the ridge to the left, driving into the main Native American force, scattering more of them and driving many into the woods on Wright's right. Wright's artillery, brought up to the ridge, fired into the trees.

The battle lasted until 2 P.M. No Army personnel were officially lost, while George Wright's claim was that Native American casualties numbered 17 to 20 dead and a number times that number wounded. Although Wright's cavalry pursued the Indians, their slower mounts, laden with much more gear, soon tired and the Army could not keep up the chase.

What should be noted is that according to the Fort Walla Walla historical society the Indians claimed a retreat from a superior foe, to fight another day, the tribesmen did so with very limited casualties even compared to the armies zero killed or wounded. George Wright also claimed that Providence (or god) was the reason that no Army personnel were touched. What should be critically noted is that crucial records were lost when George Wright died out in a shipwreck. And that the after action report comes from a recounting of events from Lt. Lawrence Kips work. Where he clearly states the audience is pampered easternets who need to here the Armies side. The Armys reputation was not flattering, and we should crucially analyze the claims by the Army staff or opportunistic native americans.

The Indian alliance, like traditional warfare wanted, was primarily light infantry and mobile mounted cavalry. Meaning that the Army achieved no meaningful victory unless they decisively crushed the tribes in a given battle. At Union Gap, no warriors were killed and the Yakima remaimed at large for years. However at Four Lakes, a mix of tech shock, arrogance from the many defeats suffered by the Army, and favorable terrain to combined arms forced a defeat that put the confederacy into a panick temporarily.

Kamiakin had counted on another Army defeat to rally more tribes and warriors to his cause and vastly enlarging his alliance. A feet that almost never occurs in Indian war history, only superseded by Sitting Bulls council of 44 nearly 28 years later. The defeat at Four Lakes forced the warriors to fall back into the plains. Although the battle was a skirmish by most standards. Unremarkable in its effect other then a technological shock of the tribes temporarily, it forced the confederacy into a defensive posture the Army abused in one more battle that remained to be fought).

== Bibliography ==
- Frey, Rodney (2001). Landscape Traveled by Coyote and Crane: The World of the Schitsu'umsh (Coeur d'Alene Indians). Seattle: University of Washington Press. ISBN 9780295801629.
- Glassley, Ray Hoard (1953). Pacific Northwest Indian Wars: The Cayuse War of 1848, the Rogue River Wars of the '50s, the Yakima War, 1853-56, the Coeur D'Alene War, 1857, the Modoc War, 1873, the Nez Perce War, 1877, the Bannock War, 1878, the Sheepeater's War of 1879. Portland, Ore.: Binfords & Mort.
- Josephy, Alvin M. (1997). The Nez Perce Indians and the Opening of the Northwest. Boston: Houghton Mifflin. ISBN 9780395850114.
- Manring, Benjamin Franklin (1912). The Conquest of the Coeur d'Alenes, Spokanes and Palouses: The Expeditions of Colonels E.J. Steptoe and George Wright Against the "Northern Indians" in 1858. Spokane, Wash.: Inland Print. Co.
- McFarland, Ronald E. (2016). Edward J. Steptoe and the Indian Wars: Life on the Frontier, 1815-1865. Jefferson, N.C.: McFarland & Company. ISBN 9781476662329.
- Pierpaoli, Paul G. Jr. (2001). "Four Lakes, Battle of". In Tucker, Spencer; Arnold, James R.; Wiener, Roberta (eds.). The Encyclopedia of North American Indian Wars, 1607-1890. Volume 1: A to L. Santa Barbara, Calif.: ABC-CLIO. ISBN 9781851096978.
- Petersen, Keith (2014). John Mullan: The Tumultuous Life of a Western Road Builder. Pullman, Wash.: Washington State University Press. ISBN 9780874223217.
- Woodworth-Ney, Laura (2004). Mapping Identity: The Creation of the Coeur d'Alene Indian Reservation, 1805-1902. Boulder, Colo.: University Press of Colorado. ISBN 9780870817618.
