= Coeur d'Alene War =

War fought between Native Americans and the United States Army

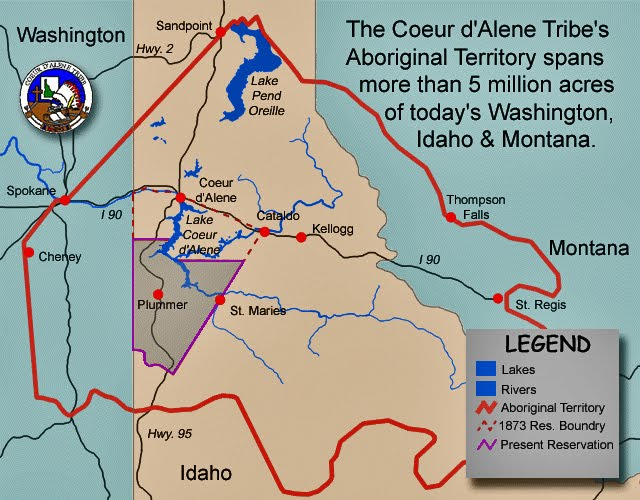
A map of the original Coeur d'Alene territory, shown in red, and the subsequent reservation, shown in purple.

The Coeur d'Alene War of 1858, also known as the Spokane-Coeur d'Alene-Pend d'oreille-Paloos War, was the second phase of the Yakima War, involving a series of encounters between the allied Native American tribes of the Skitswish ("Coeur d'Alene"), Kalispell ("Pend d'Oreille"), Spokane, Palouse and Northern Paiute against United States Army forces in Washington and Idaho.

In May 1858, a combined force of about 1,000 Skitswish, Spokane, and Palouse attacked and defeated a force of 164 American troops under Colonel Edward Steptoe at the Battle of Pine Creek.

A larger force of 601 men under Colonel George Wright was sent to subdue the tribes. On September 1, 1858, Wright's troops defeated the allied tribes at the Battle of Four Lakes and four days later (Sept. 5th) he defeated another Indian force, in the meanwhile joined by the Kalispell too, in the Battle of Spokane Plains.

After the Four Lakes battle, the army hanged seventeen Palouse along Latah Creek which was later called Hangman Creek as a result, though the name has reverted to Latah Creek in the State of Washington. In Idaho, the stream is still named Hangman Creek. Among the hanged was a chief named Qualchan of the Yakima.

== Background ==
Isaac Stevens, who became the Governor of Washington Territory in 1853, promoted the idea of a transcontinental railroad to the Pacific Northwest to transport the raw materials found in the region to the East. In 1851, Stevens had negotiated a series of treaties with many of the tribes in the area, with the aim of moving the Native Americans to reservations so that settlers could begin moving into the Northwest and begin railway and road building. The treaties promised the Indian tribes annuities in return and guaranteed that the US would prevent whites from trespassing on their allotted lands. The Skitswish Indians, however, attempted to stay out of negotiations with Stevens, hoping they could retain their ancestral lands and not be moved.

=== Yakima War ===
The discovery of gold on the upper Columbia River drainage in the summer of 1855 brought a large influx of miners into the area, trespassing on the land that was promised (during the Walla Walla Council of 1855) to many of the tribes in the area, including the Yakama. This violation angered the tribes who felt that the promises that had been made to them by the United States government were not being honored. After the Washington Territory was formally organized as a U.S. territory in 1853, treaties between the United States government and several Indian tribes in the area resulted in reluctant tribal recognition of U.S. sovereignty over a vast amount of land within the new territory. In return for this recognition, the tribes were entitled to receive half of the fish in the territory in perpetuity, awards of money and provisions, and reserved lands where white settlement would be prohibited.

While territorial governor Isaac Stevens had guaranteed the inviolability of Native American territory following tribal accession to the treaties, he lacked the legal authority to enforce it pending ratification of the agreements by the United States Senate. Meanwhile, the widely publicized discovery of gold in Yakama territory prompted an influx of unruly prospectors who traveled, unchecked, across the newly defined tribal lands, to the growing consternation of Indian leaders. In 1855 two of these prospectors were killed by Qualchan, the nephew of Kamiakin, after it was discovered they had raped a Yakama woman.[2]

Outbreak of hostilities Death of Mosheel’s family A party of American miners came across two Yakama women, a mother and daughter traveling together with a baby. The miners assaulted and killed both women and the infant. The husband and father of the women, a Yakama man named Mosheel, collected two friends, one of whom was Qualchin, and the men tracked down the miners who had killed Mosheel’s family. They ambushed the murderers in their camp and killed all of them.[3] This incited the Yakama War. The war started October 5, 1855 and on Governor Stevens imposed a peace treaty, under which most of the tribes were to go to reservations, at a peace council at Fort Walla Walla bringing an end to the Yakima War.

== Causes of the Skitswish War ==
In 1857, Isaac Stevens was elected as the Washington territorial delegate to Congress, causing him to leave the territory. His departure angered the tribes who had not yet made treaties. The Skitwish, seeing that white settlement in the area was inevitable, feared that without a treaty, they would lose the rights to their ancestral lands and therefore have no protection against the encroaching white settlers. When the settlers actually did begin moving onto tribal lands, there were strong tensions between the white miners and the tribes, which caused small skirmishes that raised the tribes' fears of United States military intervention.

=== Tribal alliance ===
A Yakima Chief, Qualchan, who was disgruntled following the loss of the Yakima War to the U.S. Army, gathered the Colville, the Skitswish, the Columbia River, and the Kalispel tribes at a council in order to convince the tribes that the white man was encroaching on their lands and that they needed to defend them. The Skitswish and other tribes subsequently held a council discussing their concerns that the army would invade their territory as a result of the growing tensions. A line was drawn at the Snake River, agreeing that if the army crossed it, they would have effectively crossed into the Indians' territory, and this would be considered a hostile action. The Skitswish tribe was split in their feelings toward war, while the Kalispell allies, old war-chief Big Canoe and younger war-chief Spotted Coyote, were ready but not longing to fight anyway. The Skitswish tribal leaders (the head chief Bassa called "Vincent", his brother-in-law "Zachariah", Stellam, and younger Kumpasket, Seltis and war-leader Lmena called "Victor") did not want war if not strictly necessary to defend their people against an attack, fearing that the consequences to their people would be devastating, while the younger warriors, led by Melkapsi, were angry and wanted to fight.

=== Crossing of the Snake River ===
Due to a miner's a death in Colville, Washington, committed by unknown Indians in early 1858, Colonel Edward Steptoe received orders to lead an expedition to the area to show the strength of the U.S. Army to convince the Indians to turn in those who were responsible. He left Fort Walla Walla in May 1858 to head for the Colville area and planned to cut through the Skitswish and Spokane territories. However, the troops that Steptoe brought numbered only 159, and they were very poorly armed. Steptoe expected cooperation from the Nez Perce and Spokanes since in the past they had given him boats and men at the Snake River, which was the main barrier to reaching Colville. Therefore, in their attempts to reach Colville, Steptoe crossed the Snake River, unaided however, which was the previously assigned line of hostility, sparking the tribes' belief that the army was going to engage them. The Skitswish, the Palouse led by chief Tilcoax (Wolf Necklace), the Spokane, and some of the Yakima gathered in preparation of a fight. Chief Vincent of the Skitswish demanded Steptoe's reason for his trespass, and he responded that they were on their way to Colville. Vincent returned to his camp to try and calm down the young warriors who were intent on fighting, while Steptoe attempted to return to Fort Walla Walla. Steptoe's journey, however, was interrupted by the Indian leaders, who asked him to return to meet with them. The meeting ended with a handshake and a mutual agreement that Steptoe would leave their territory and travel via a different route to reach Colville. Despite this peaceful agreement, a frustrated Skitswish warrior, badly arguing with the Nimipu scouts, later started a fight shooting at them, provoking the start of fighting between Steptoe and the Skitswish, Spokane, and other tribes. Steptoe's men struggled to fight the 1000 Indian warriors, but because they were so severely outnumbered, Steptoe made the decision to escape that night, and return to Fort Walla Walla.

=== General Clarke's response ===
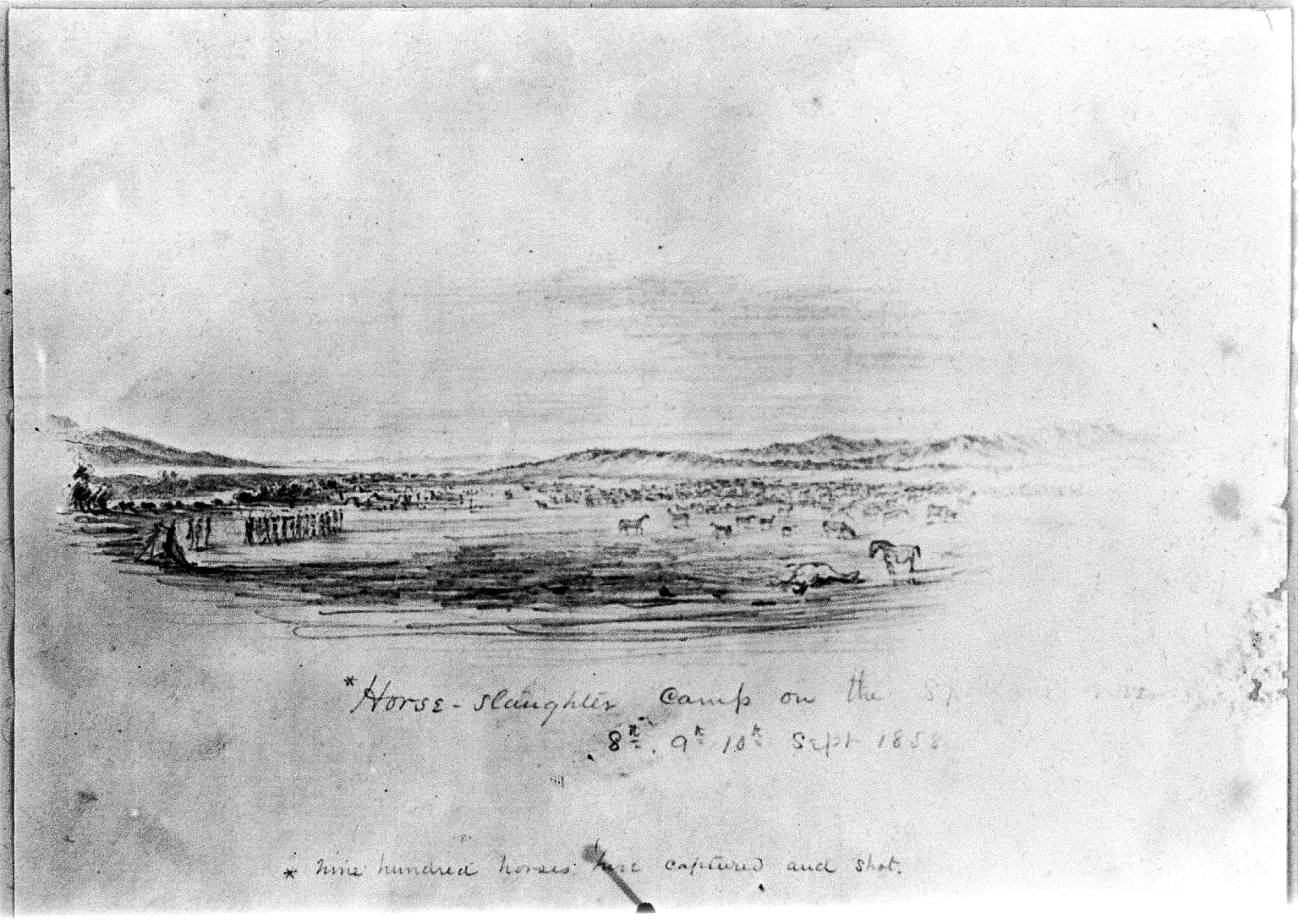
Depiction of Horse-slaughter camp where Native American horses were killed, 1858.

After hearing the news of Steptoe's clash on top of other recent unsatisfactory events, such as the Yakima War, that the Army had suffered at the hands of the Indians, General Newman S. Clarke would not tolerate another defeat. When Steptoe returned to the fort, Clarke sent a peace proposal in June 1858, demanding that the tribes surrender their weapons and those who were responsible for the fighting. The tribes, however, were divided in their opinions and could not agree upon a solution. General Clarke, determined not be defeated again at the hands of the Indians, responded by sending a strong military force. He sent orders to Army posts calling for all available regulars to be sent in to aid the fight. Clarke sent all available troops to the region, including those under the leadership of Colonel George Wright, who had previously been a leading figure in the Yakima War. Clarke ordered the troops to attack vigorously until they had complete submission by the Indians.

=== Two main battles ===
Wright led the United States troops at the Battle of Four Lakes on September 1, and was able to beat back the tribal forces. The tribes then fought back on September 5 in the Battle of Spokane Plains, where they set fire to the grass and shot at the troops through the smoke; while there was no decisive winner, the tribes were greatly weakened. At this point, the tribes were greatly divided over whether to continue fighting, as the elder leaders saw little chance of victory. Wright then killed over 800 of the Indians' horses that had been captured throughout the fighting, depriving the tribes of their means to fight and hunt, and showing the extremes that the Army would go to in order to subdue the tribes. The Chiefs of the Skitswish tribe, who realized that they would not be able to defeat the Army, especially without the aid of their horses, sent a Skitswish member to Wright's camp to present their peace proposal.

== Peace negotiations ==
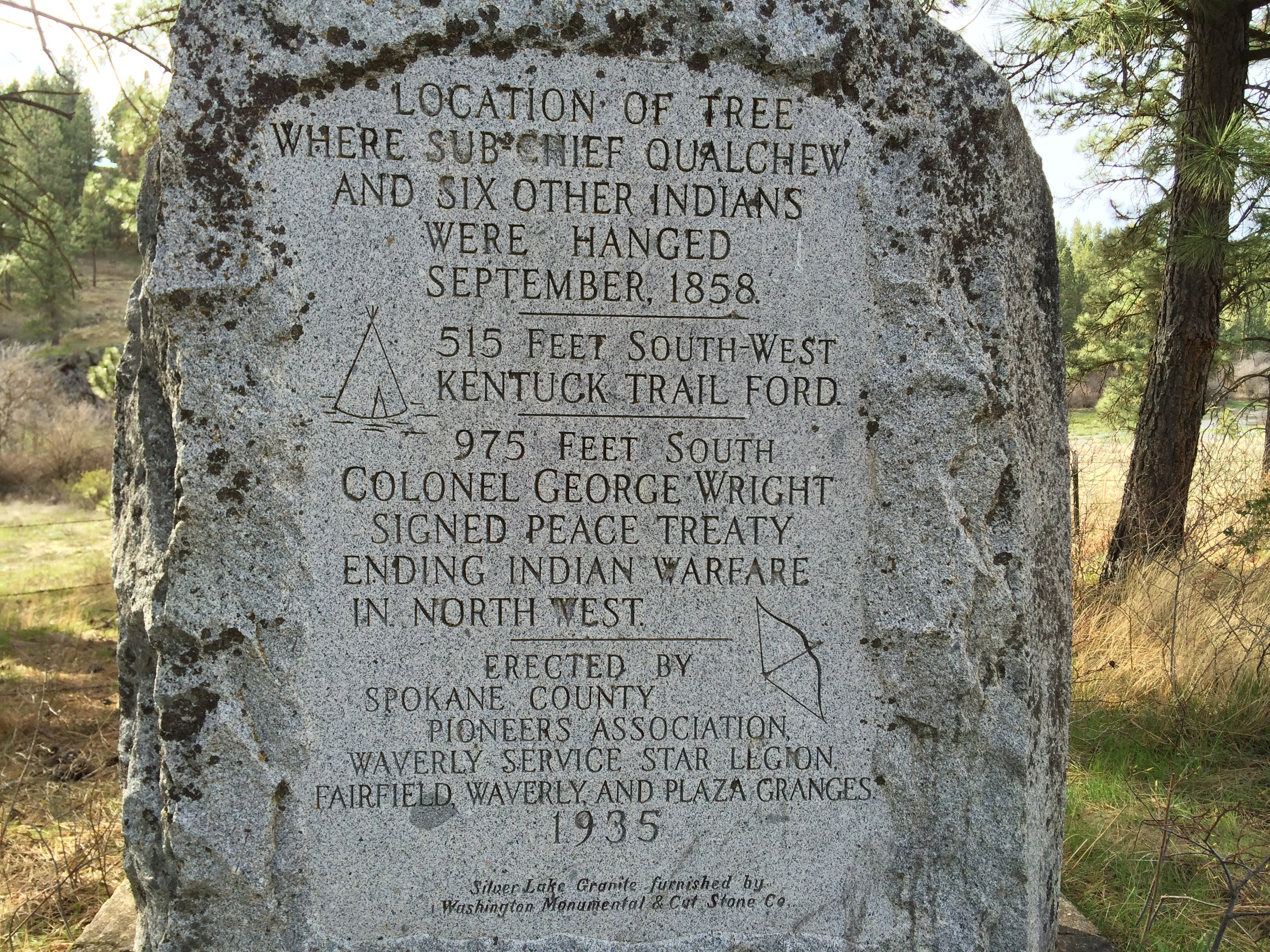
Chief Qualchan hanging historical marker.

Wright arrived to meet with the tribes three days later and negotiated a peace treaty, to which the Skitswish's and the other tribes agreed to, realizing that they would not be able to defeat the United States troops. The treaty required that the Skitswish return army property and hand over the individuals responsible for the attack on Steptoe, and give permission for whites to pass through their lands without interference in the future. In return, Wright promised that there would be no more war waged against the Skitswish people. The tribes turned over those who were responsible, including Qualchan, who had been one of the main leaders throughout, and they were hanged at Latah Creek. Wright's actions opened the mountain valley of the Pacific Northwest to settlement by whites, and forced the tribes onto reservations that consisted of only a fraction of their former lands, where they were quickly struck by disease and malnutrition as a result.
