= Steptoe Battlefield State Park Heritage Site =

State park in the U.S. state of Washington

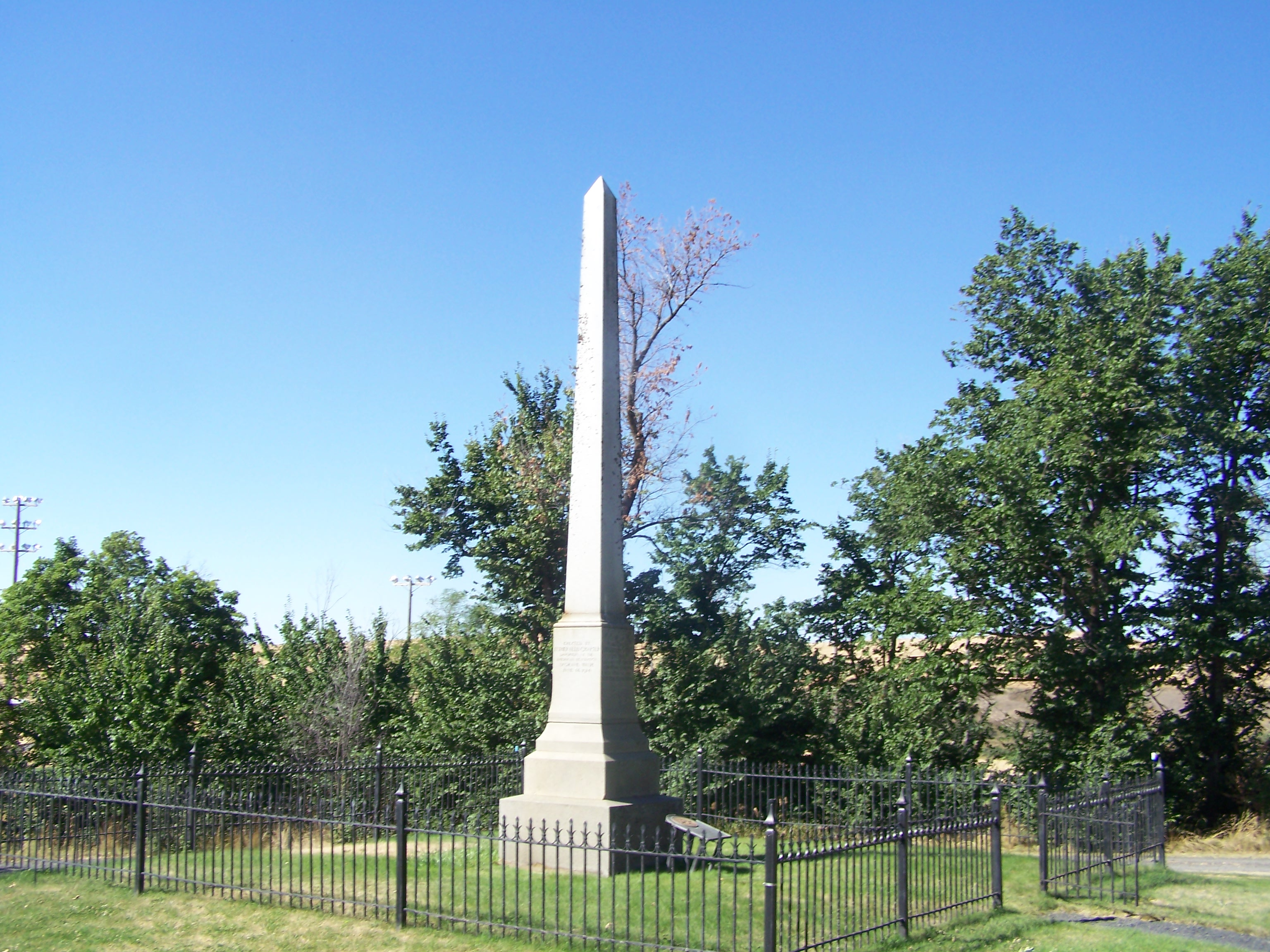
- The monument at the park

- Location within Washington (state) Location within the United States
- Location: Rosalia, Washington, United States
- Coordinates: 47°13′43″N 117°21′55″W
- Area: 3 acres (1.2 ha)
- Elevation: 2,365 ft (721 m)
- Established: 1950
- Administrator: Washington State Parks and Recreation Commission
- Website: Official website
- Steptoe Battlefield Site
- U.S. National Register of Historic Places
- Location: Rosalia, Whitman County, Washington.
- NRHP reference No.: 76001924

Significant dates
- Battle: 1858
- Added to NRHP: May 6, 1976

Steptoe Battlefield State Park Heritage Site, formerly named Steptoe Battlefield State Park, is a three-acre (1.2 ha) heritage site on the southeast side of Rosalia in Whitman County, Washington. The state park memorializes a running battle that occurred in 1858, the Battle of Pine Creek, between American soldiers under the command of Lt. Col. Edward Steptoe and a large band of Spokane, Palouse, and Coeur d'Alene Native Americans. Interpretive signage at the park describes the course of the battle.

== Park history ==
In 1914, the Daughters of the American Revolution, Esther Reed Chapter, erected a stone monument near the location where the Steptoe troops took their final stand. The site of the monument became a state park in 1950. It was added to the National Register of Historic Places in 1976. In 2014, the park received the designation of "state park heritage site."
