= Latah (disambiguation) =

Latah may refer to:

- Latah, a culture-specific startle disorder
- Latah County, Idaho
- Latah, Washington
- Latah Creek
- Latah Formation
