= Steptoe, Washington =

Census-designated place in Whitman County, Washington, United States

Steptoe
- CDP
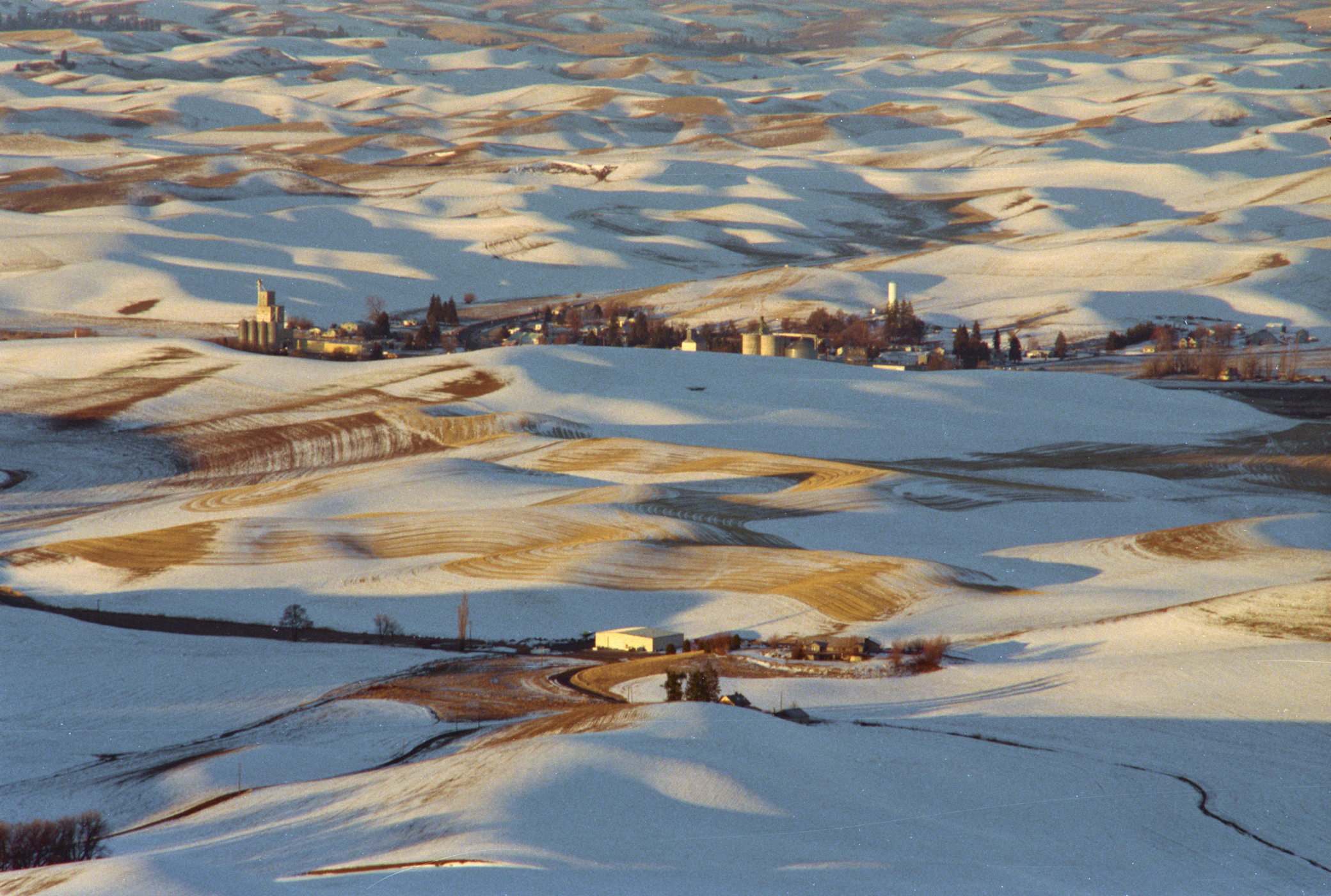
- Overview of Steptoe, Washington

- Location within Washington (state) Location within the United States Location within North America
- Coordinates: 47°00′12″N 117°21′04″W
- Country: United States
- State: Washington
- County: Whitman
- Elevation: 2,366 ft (721 m)
- Time zone: UTC-8 (Pacific (PST))
  - Summer (DST): UTC-7 (PDT)
- ZIP code: 99111
- Area code: 509
- GNIS feature ID: 2586748

Steptoe is a small unincorporated rural town in Whitman County, Washington, United States. The ZIP Code for Steptoe is 99111.

A post office called Steptoe was established in 1875. The community is named after Colonel Edward Steptoe for a battle located north of Steptoe near Rosalia, Washington.

U.S. Route 195 runs through Steptoe, connecting it with the county seat, Colfax, 11 miles to the south and the region's largest city, Spokane, 43 miles to the north. Steptoe Butte rises to a peak more than 1,000 feet above the otherwise rolling Palouse grasslands four miles northeast of the community.

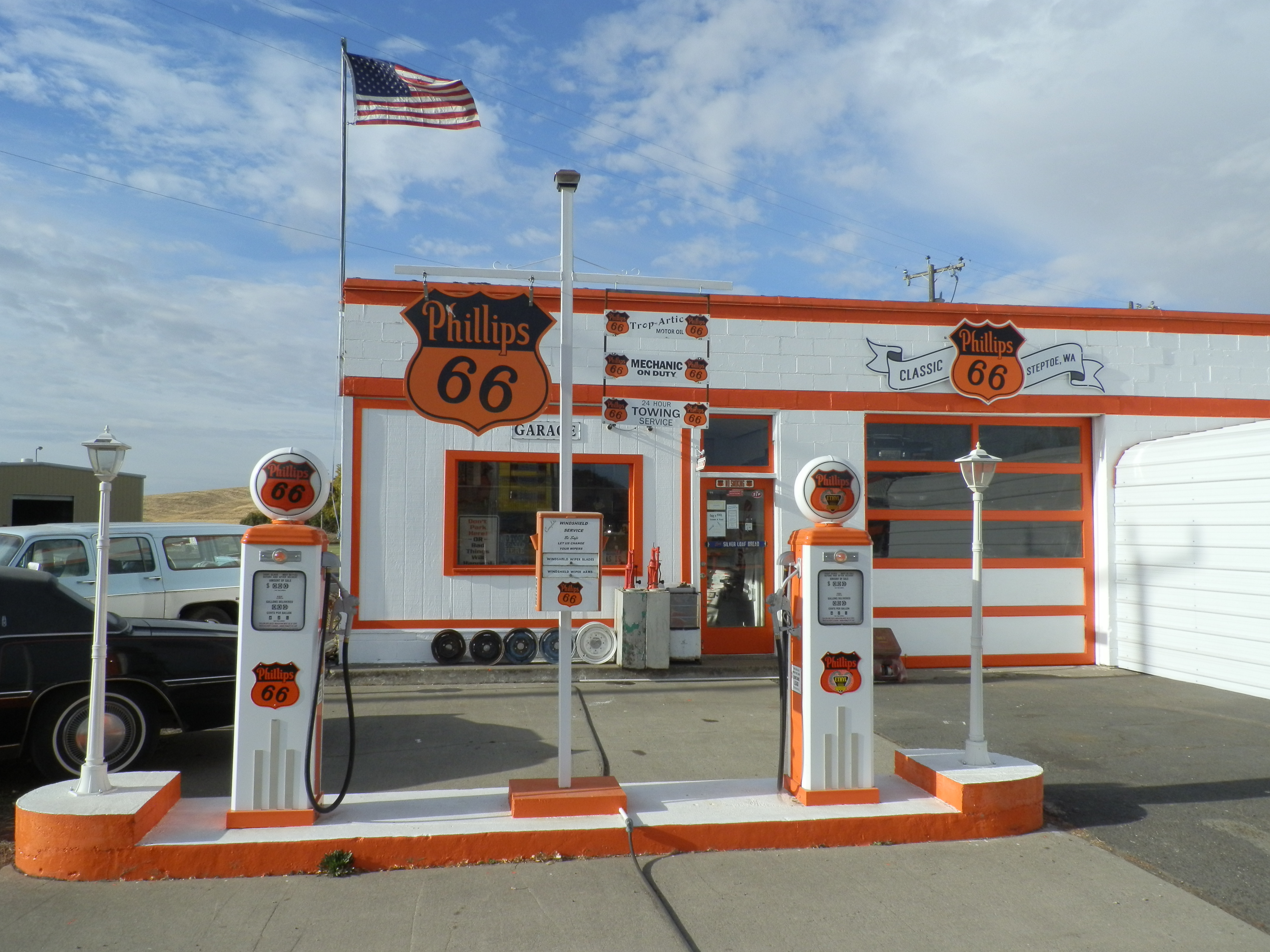
Restored service station for display in Steptoe, Washington.

== Demographics ==
Historical population
Census	Pop.	Note	%±
2010	180		—
2020	160		−11.1%
U.S. Decennial Census; 2000 2010

Steptoe first appeared as a census designated place in the 2010 U.S. census.

=== Racial and ethnic composition ===
Steptoe CDP, Washington – Racial and ethnic composition Note: the US Census treats Hispanic/Latino as an ethnic category. This table excludes Latinos from the racial categories and assigns them to a separate category. Hispanics/Latinos may be of any race.
Race / Ethnicity (NH = Non-Hispanic)	Pop 2010	Pop 2020	% 2010	% 2020
White alone (NH)	172	141	95.56%	88.13%
Black or African American alone (NH)	1	0	0.56%	0.00%
Native American or Alaska Native alone (NH)	2	3	1.11%	1.88%
Asian alone (NH)	0	0	0.00%	0.00%
Native Hawaiian or Pacific Islander alone (NH)	0	0	0.00%	0.00%
Other race alone (NH)	1	0	0.56%	0.00%
Mixed race or Multiracial (NH)	4	14	2.22%	8.75%
Hispanic or Latino (any race)	0	2	0.00%	1.25%
Total	180	160	100.00%	100.00%
