= Fort Walla Walla =

Coordinates: 46.04741°N 118.35694°W

- Fort Walla Walla Historic District
- U.S. National Register of Historic Places
- U.S. Historic district
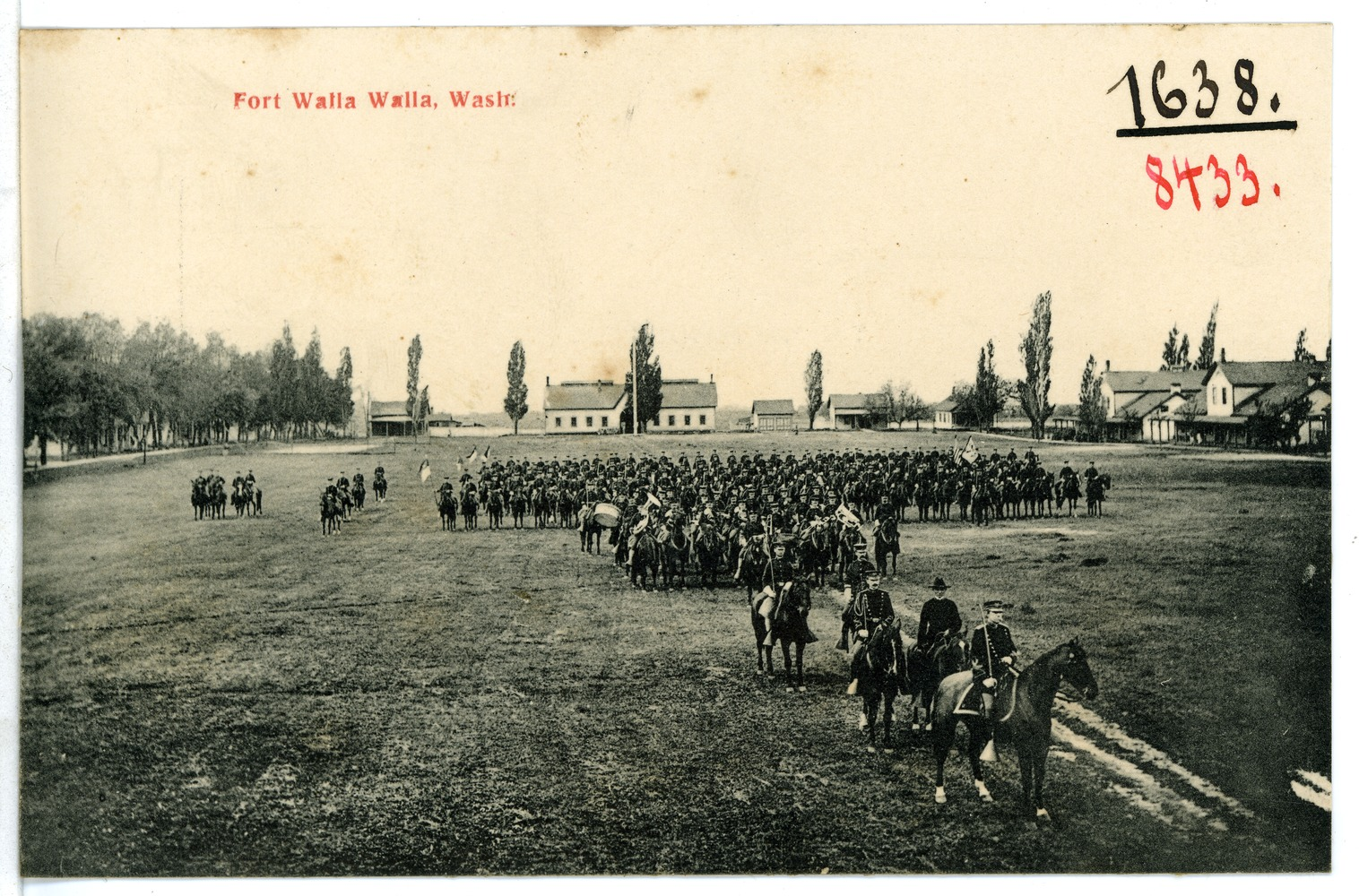
- Fort Walla Walla in 1906

- Location within Washington (state)
- Location: 77 Wainwright Drive, Walla Walla, Washington
- Built: 1858
- Architectural style: Second Empire
- NRHP reference No.: 74001985
- Added to NRHP: April 16, 1974

Fort Walla Walla is a United States Army fort located in Walla Walla, Washington. The first Fort Walla Walla was established July 1856, by Lieutenant Colonel Edward Steptoe, 9th Infantry Regiment. A second Fort Walla Walla was occupied September 23, 1856. The third and permanent military Fort Walla Walla was built in 1858 and adjoined Steptoeville, now Walla Walla, Washington, a community that had grown up around the second fort. An executive order on May 7, 1859, declared the fort a military reservation containing 640 acres devoted to military purposes and a further 640 acres each of hay and timber reserves. On September 28, 1910, soldiers from the 1st Cavalry lowered the flag closing the fort. In 1917, the fort briefly reopened to train men of the First Battalion Washington Field Artillery in support of action in World War I. In 1921, the fort and property were turned over to the Veterans Administration where 15 original buildings from the military era remain. Today, the complex contains a park, Fort Walla Walla Museum, and the Jonathan M. Wainright Memorial VA Medical Center.

== Units stationed at Fort Walla Walla ==
- 1856-1858 4th Infantry Regiment (United States)
- 1856-1861 1st Dragoons
- 1856-1861 9th Infantry
- 1856-1858 3rd Artillery
- 1861-1861 2nd California Volunteers
- 1862-1865 1st Washington Territorial Volunteer Infantry
- 1862-1865 1st Oregon Volunteer Cavalry
- 1865-1865 1st Oregon Volunteer Infantry
- 1867-1873 Caretaker detachment
- 1873-1875 21st Infantry
- 1876-1884 1st Cavalry
- 1878-1878 2nd Infantry
- 1884-1890 2nd Cavalry
- 1890-1898 4th Cavalry
- 1899-1899 24th Infantry (Company M, Buffalo Soldiers)
- 1899-1901 6th Cavalry
- 1901-1902 Field Artillery
- 1902-1904 9th Cavalry (Buffalo Soldiers), including the Field Staff, Band and E, F, G, and H Companies
- 1904-1904 19th Infantry
- 1905-1908 14th Cavalry

United States Army Indian Scouts served with troops from Fort Walla Walla until at least 1893. Indian Scouts saved the lives of many of Lt Col Steptoe's personnel during the Battle of Pine Creek. Most scouts came from the Nez Perce tribe.

== Military action taken from Fort Walla Walla ==
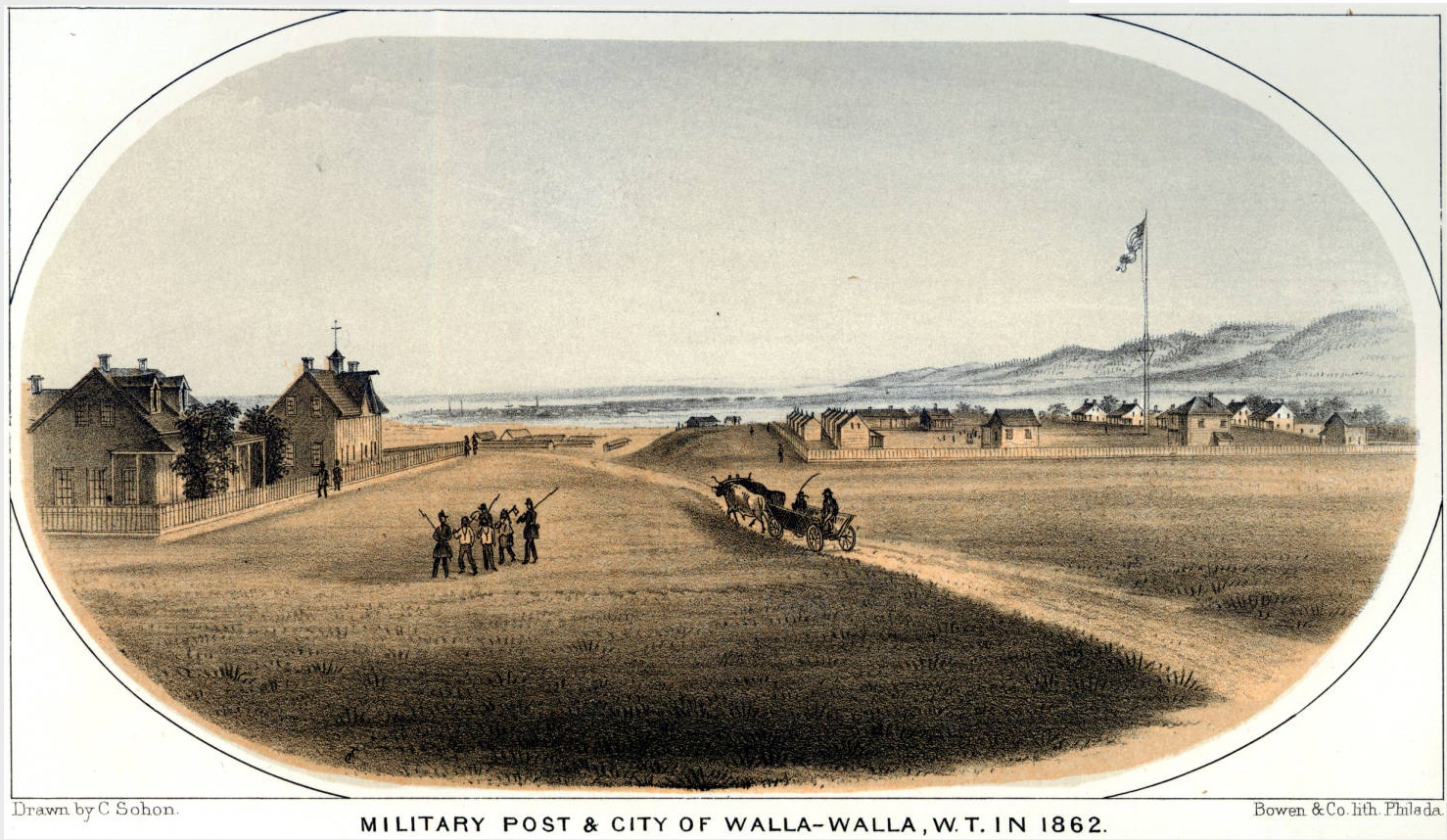
Illustration of Fort Walla Walla, 1862.

In May 1858, the Battle of Pine Creek took place, when Lt Col. Steptoe lead troops north to investigate the reported murder of miners and was forced to retreat after being attacked by a mixed force of Spokane, Palouse, and Coeur d'Alene Indians near present Rosalia, Washington.

In August 1858, the Battle of Four Lakes took place when Colonel George Wright lead units of the 9th Infantry, 3rd Artillery, and 1st Dragoons in a punitive action after the loss during the Battle of Pine Creek. The force met up with a large force of Indians in the area between present Cheney and Medical Lake. Near Liberty Lake, Colonel Wright's troops captured 800 Indian horses, the principal wealth for the tribes, and slaughtered them leading to the cessation of all hostilities by the tribes.

On June 17, 1877, soldiers of the 1st Cavalry Regiment were involved in the Battle of White Bird Canyon during the Nez Perce War. More than 30 U. S. soldiers died during the battle. A monument to those killed is at the Fort Walla Walla Cemetery.

Between July 3 and 5, 1877, members of E and L Companies of the 1st Cavalry engaged the Nez Perce Indians at the Battle of Cottonwood with a loss of ten soldiers. Their remains are also buried in the Fort Walla Walla Cemetery.

== Roads connecting with Fort Walla Walla ==
Naches Pass road, between Fort Walla Walla and Fort Steilacoom, was built in 1853 by local residents after waiting for Lieutenant George B. McClellan to construct the route. It proved difficult to use with some very steep descents.

The Fort Walla Walla–Fort Colville Military Road was built on the long established native trail and fur trader's route between Walla Walla and Kettle Falls and the Hudson Bay Company's Fort Colville. Captain Pinkney Lugenbeel and his soldiers improved the road to support wagons in June 1859 on their way to build U. S. Fort Colville.

In July 1859, US Army Lieutenant John Mullan followed the Fort Walla Walla Fort Colville Military Road until just north of Benge, Washington and then built the 600-mile Mullan Road from Fort Walla Walla to Fort Benton, Montana through the Rocky Mountains.

== Fort Walla Walla Museum ==
The Fort Walla Walla Museum comprises 15 acres of the Fort Walla Walla Park, and includes four exhibit halls and a 17-building pioneer village. The museum offers living history performances each season on weekends and children's programs.

The pioneer village includes several cabins, an outhouse, harness shop, blacksmith shop, schools, a jail, train depot, doctor's office and other structures.

The exhibit halls include displays of military weapons and artifacts, tools, agricultural equipment, antique vehicles and firefighting vehicles, clothing and textiles.
