= Fort George Wright =

- Fort George Wright Historic District
- U.S. National Register of Historic Places
- U.S. Historic district
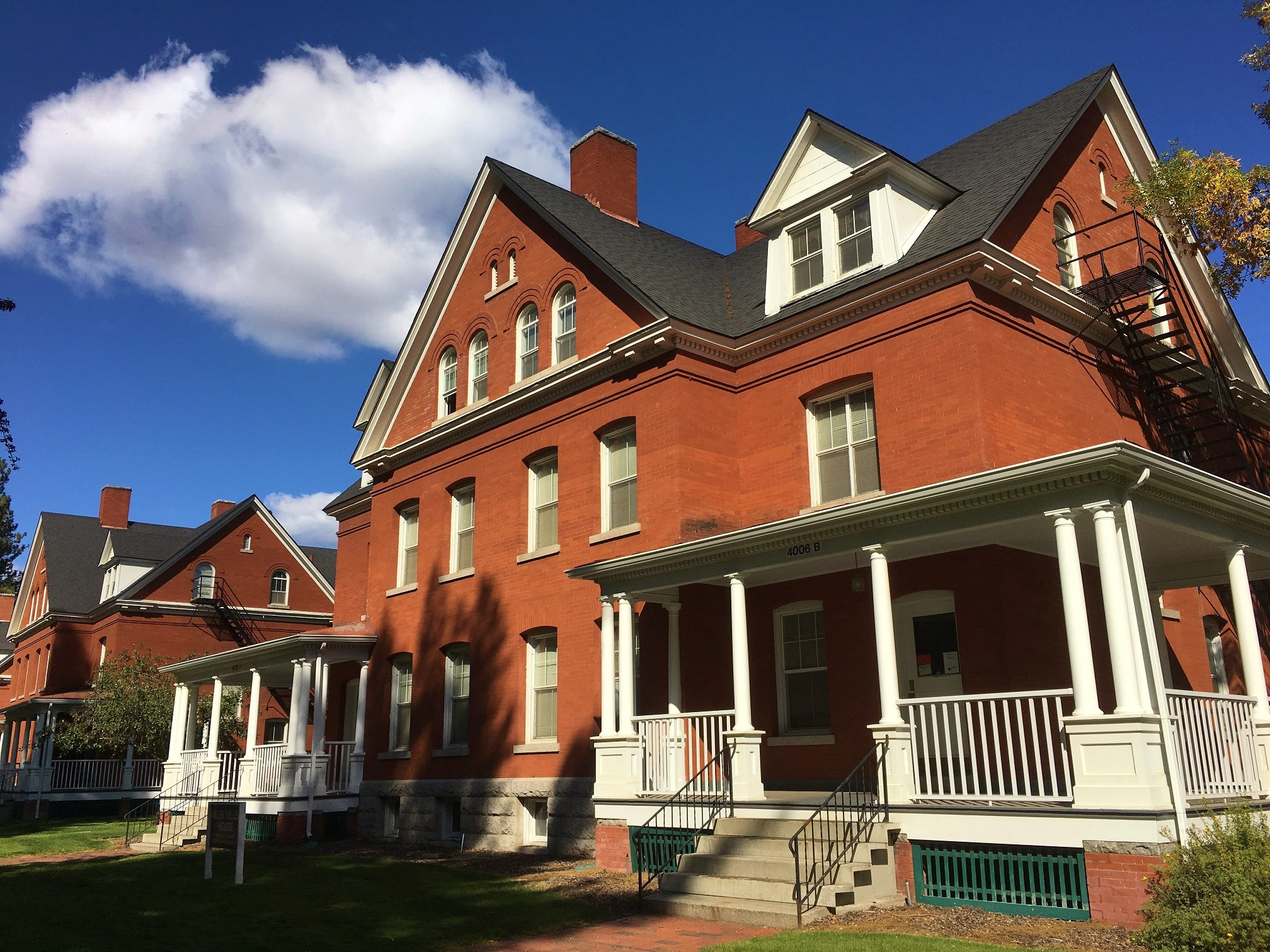

- Location within Washington (state) Location within the United States
- Nearest city: Spokane, Washington
- Coordinates: 47°40′42″N 117°28′27″W
- Area: 250 acres (100 ha)
- Built: 1896, 130 years ago
- Architect: U.S. Government
- Architectural style: Colonial Revival, Queen Anne, Georgian Revival
- NRHP reference No.: 76001918
- Added to NRHP: May 17, 1976

Fort George Wright is a land area in the northwest United States, located in Spokane, Washington's West Hills neighborhood. It is named after General George Wright, who had been stationed in the area.

== History ==
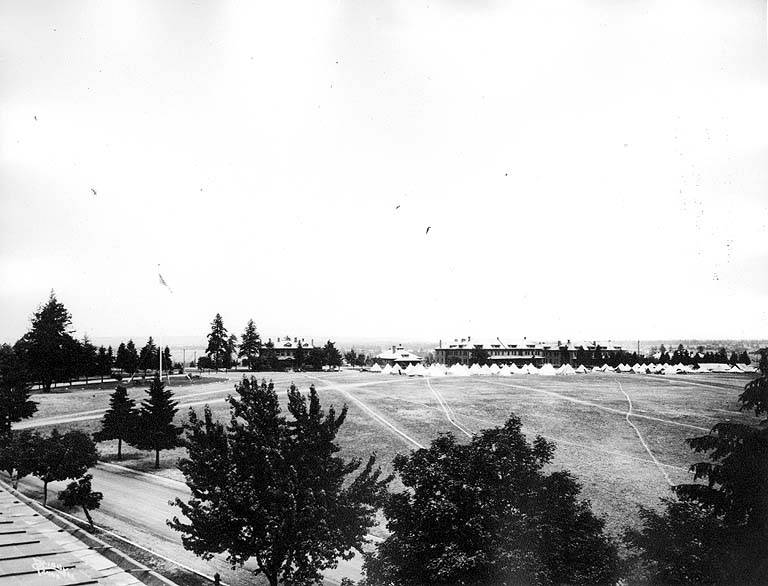
Fort George Wright, ca. 1918

In 1895, local residents purchased the area then known as Twickenham Park, which was deeded to the government for the construction of a military post. With Congress’ authorization, the $40,000 purchase of 1,022 acres (414 ha) was made in 1896.

Construction of the fort began in 1897 and it officially opened in 1899. Most of the buildings present were built between 1897 and 1906.

In 1909-1910 the fort was used to imprison members of the Industrial Workers of the World arrested during the Spokane Free Speech Fight.

"Between 1899 and 1940, it primarily housed mounted infantry units such as the 24th and 25th "Buffalo soldier" regiments, and the 4th Infantry Division which served during the massive St. Mihiel and Meuse-Argonne Offensives in WWI and would go on to land on the beaches of Normandy in WWII."

In September 1915, then Lieutenant Omar Bradley reported to the 14th Infantry Regiment (United States) in Ft. Wright.

In response to the Great Depression, President Franklin D. Roosevelt called for a series of New Deal programs including the establishment of a Civilian Conservation Corps (CCC). The CCC's inland NorthWest presence was established out of Fort George Wright, which was the headquarters for the Fort George Wright District.

== World War II ==
Fort George Wright became headquarters for the Northwest Air District on 9 January 1941, responsible for air defense and antisubmarine patrols for the Pacific northwest of the United States.

On 28 February 1941, the headquarters staff of the Northwest Air District moved from Felts Field to new headquarters offices at Fort George Wright. From there the air activities of eleven northwest states would be directed. The District, amidst some confusion, was redesignated 2d Air Force on 26 March 1941.

Clark Gable, of Gone with the Wind fame, was briefly stationed at Fort George Wright in January 1943 for training on his special assignment working on a recruitment film in an effort to recruit more gunners for the Army Air Force.

The parade ground was opened to air traffic on 12 June 1942, accommodating liaison and courier planes in support of the HQ 2d AF mission.

The headquarters of the 2d Air Force relocated in June 1943 to Colorado Springs, Colorado.

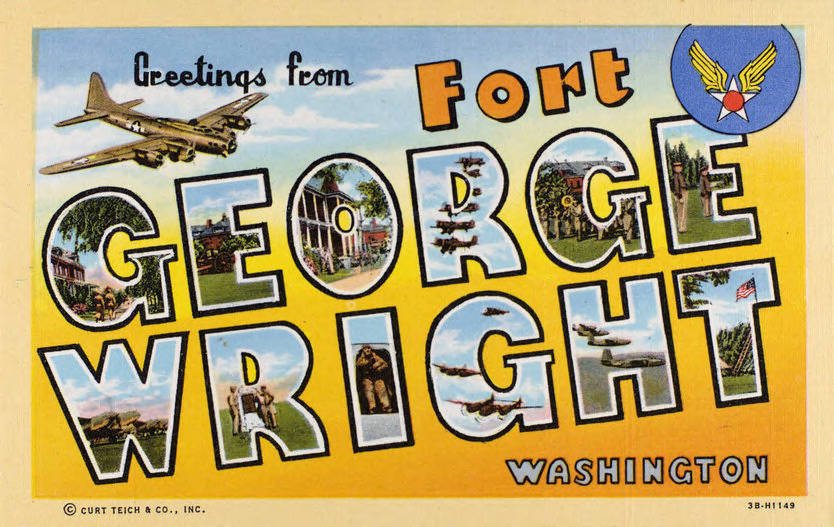
Curt Teich large-letter postcard 1943

== Post-war ==
Fort Wright was used for military purposes until 1957, when the government declared the fort surplus and gave educational facilities priority to purchase the property. Some of the land was used for Spokane Falls Community College in 1960.

In May 1976, the campus was listed as the Fort George Wright Historic District in the National Register of Historic Places. This was because on the site there is also located St. Michael's Mission; the building of 1882 was originally located near the Bigelow Gulch Road and was moved to the Fort Wright campus.

The Fort George Wright cemetery, a small square lot northwest of Fort George Wright, is also located on the land. It is managed by Fairchild AFB. It includes service men and families.

The original grass field for Memorial Stadium (now Joe Albi Stadium) was taken from the lush sod of the parade grounds at the fort in the summer of 1950.

In 2020, spurred on by calls for racial justice in the wake of the George Floyd protests, Fort George Wright Drive, which runs through the area, was renamed Whistalks Way. In 2021, the campus of the Mukogawa Fort Wright Institute was renamed as well, to Mukogawa U.S. Campus.
