= List of wars of the Indigenous peoples of North America =

Wars of the Indigenous Peoples of North America refers to conflicts between the Indigenous peoples of North America and Western powers in territory now part of Canada, the United States, and Mexico. At various times Indigenous peoples fought against forces from the Russian, Spanish, French and British colonial empires, and with residents of Canada, the United States, and Mexico. Wars between the United States and Canada and Indigenous people are covered in the American Indian Wars article. Wars other than those referred to in the US and in Canada as the Indian Wars include:

- Pequot War (1637–1638) — British colonists in what is now Massachusetts allied with some Indian tribes, against the Pequot tribe
- Kieft's War (1643–1645) — between Dutch settlers in New Netherland (what are now the states of New York, New Jersey, and the surrounding area) and Wappinger Indians
- French and Iroquois Wars (mid-17th century) — in eastern North America between Indian nations of the Iroquois Confederation, supported by the Dutch colonists of New Netherland, and the largely Algonquian-speaking tribes of the Great Lakes region, allied with French colonists
- King Philip's War (1675–1676) — in present-day southern New England
- Tuscarora War (1711–1715) — War in North Carolina between Tuscarora and British colonists and British-allied tribes
- Yamasee War (1715–1717) — War between European colonists in South Carolina and numerous Indian tribes
- Chickasaw Wars (1720–1760) — Unsuccessful campaign by French and Choctaw against the Chickasaw
- Natchez revolt (1729–1731) — War between the Natchez and the French of Louisiana
- Pontiac's Rebellion (1763–64) — War of numerous joint Indian tribes in the Great Lakes region against British forts and settlements
- Battle of Point Pleasant (1774) — British colony of Virginia against Indians of Shawnee and Mingo, fought in what is now West Virginia.
- Battle of Sitka (1804) — Russian America
- Battle of Port Gamble, Puget Sound, Washington Territory, between USS Massachusetts and Haida and Tlingit raiders from British and Russian territories.
- Conflicts along the Okanagan Trail in 1858 in British Columbia were related to the Yakima War in Washington Territory
- Fraser Canyon War (1858) – Colony of British Columbia (white irregulars in British territory against the Nlaka'pamux)
- Lamalcha War (1863) — Colony of British Columbia (Royal Navy vs Lamalcha people
- Chilcotin War (1864) — Colony of British Columbia (White workers against the Tsilhqot'in)
- Fisherville War (1860s) — Colony of British Columbia
- Tobacco Plains War (1860s) — Colony of British Columbia
- Rossland War (1860s) — Colony of British Columbia
- Red River Rebellion (1869) — Rupert's Land
- Great Sioux War (1876–77)
- Wild Horse Creek War (1880s) — British Columbia (see Fort Steele)
- North-West Rebellion (1885) — District of Saskatchewan (Assiniboine–Cree, and Métis people against Canadian forces)
