= John Paulson Creek =

River in Washington, United States

Coordinates: 47°15′03″N 117°26′16″W

John Paulson Creek is a stream in the U.S. state of Washington.

John Paulson Creek was named for an early settler.

== See also ==
- List of rivers of Washington (state)
