= Rosalia, Washington =

Rosalia
- Town
- Rosalia, Washington
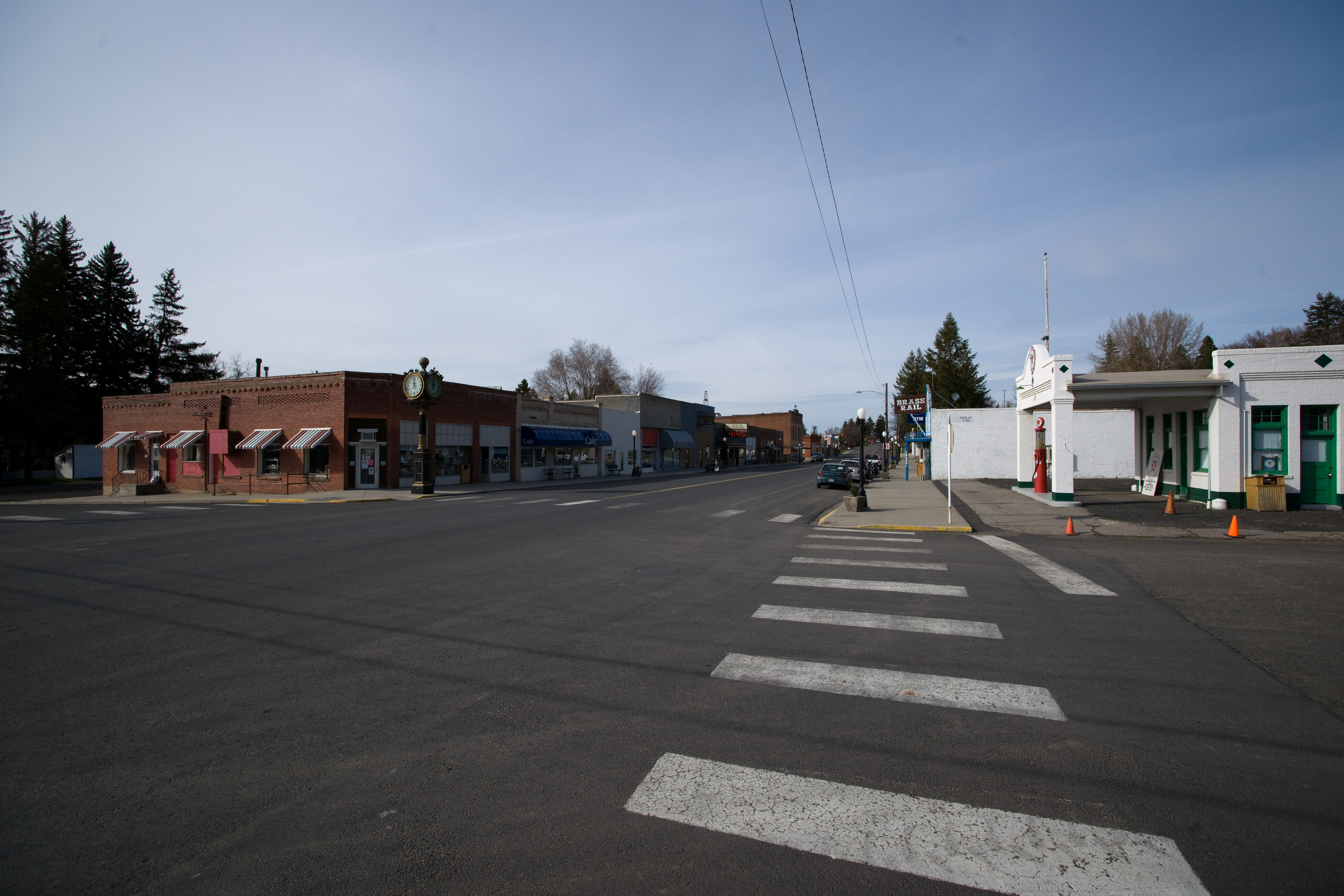
- Central Rosalia

- Location of Rosalia, Washington
- Coordinates: 47°14′11″N 117°22′18″W
- Country: United States
- State: Washington
- County: Whitman

Area
  - Total: 0.63 sq mi (1.63 km^{2})
  - Land: 0.63 sq mi (1.63 km^{2})
  - Water: 0 sq mi (0.00 km^{2})
- Elevation: 2,336 ft (712 m)

Population (2020)
  - Total: 598
  - Density: 950/sq mi (367/km^{2})
- Time zone: UTC-8 (Pacific (PST))
  - Summer (DST): UTC-7 (PDT)
- ZIP code: 99170
- Area code: 509
- FIPS code: 53-59775
- GNIS feature ID: 2412576
- Website: Town of Rosalia

Rosalia is a town in Whitman County, Washington, United States. It is an agricultural community in the Palouse region, at an elevation of 2,238 feet (682 m) above sea level. Its population was 598 at the 2020 census.

== History ==
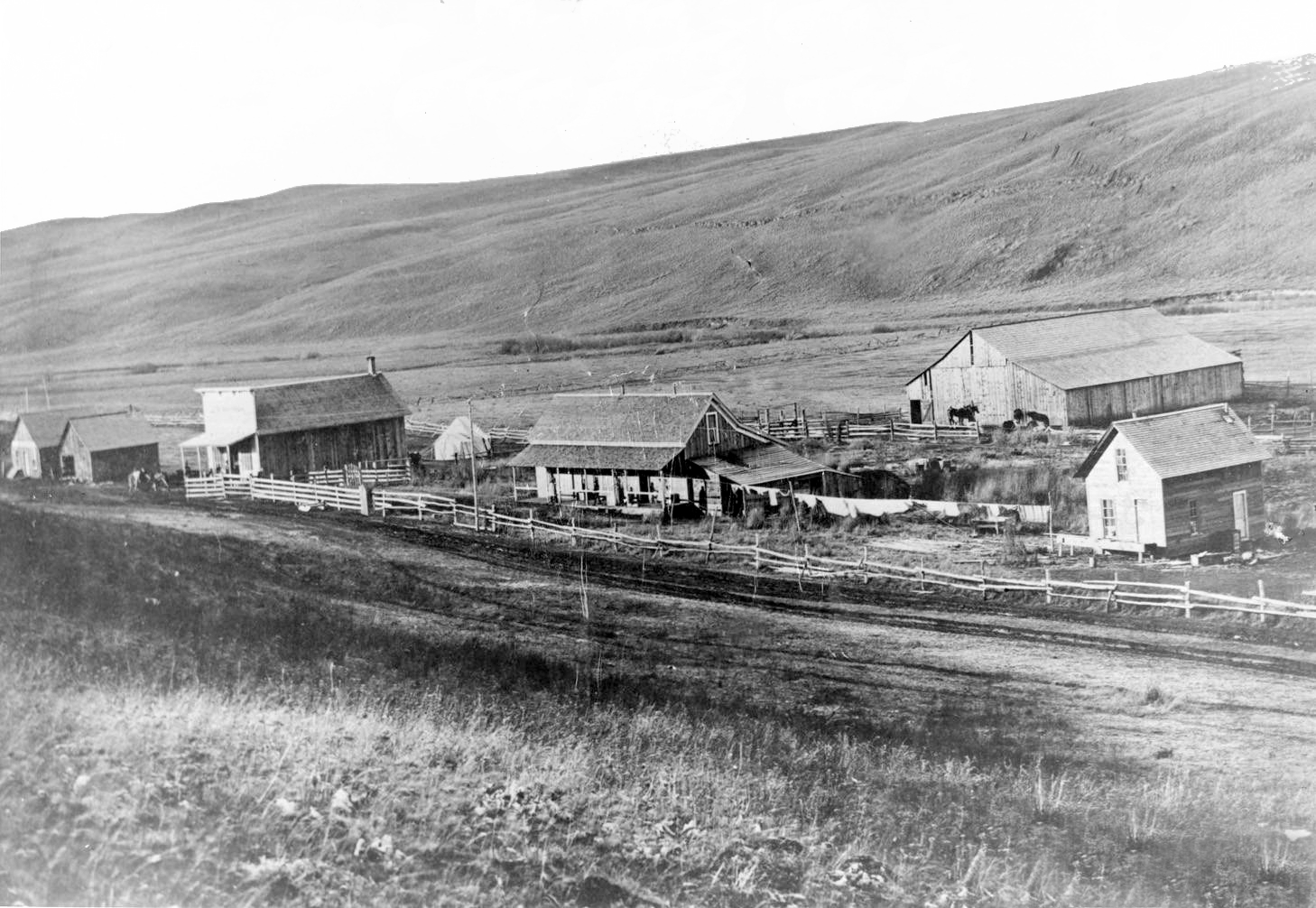
Rosalia, 1880

Rosalia was the site of an 1858 Battle of Pine Creek between United States troops, including Nez Perce allies, under Brevet Lieutenant Colonel Edward Steptoe, and members of the Coeur d'Alene, Palus and Spokane Native American tribes.

Rosalia was founded in 1870 by T.J. Favorite, who named it for his wife. Rosalia was officially incorporated on March 23, 1894.

== Geography ==
According to the United States Census Bureau, the town has a total area of 0.62 square miles (1.61 km^{2}), all of it land.

Pine Creek and John Paulson Creek flow nearby.

=== Climate ===
Rosalia's climate is classified as a dry-summer humid continental climate (Dsb) according to the Köppen climate classification.

Climate data for Rosalia, Washington (1991–2020 normals, extremes 1893–present)
Month	Jan	Feb	Mar	Apr	May	Jun	Jul	Aug	Sep	Oct	Nov	Dec	Year
Record high °F (°C)	60 (16)	66 (19)	74 (23)	94 (34)	98 (37)	107 (42)	111 (44)	108 (42)	105 (41)	90 (32)	72 (22)	64 (18)	111 (44)
Mean daily maximum °F (°C)	36.7 (2.6)	41.5 (5.3)	49.6 (9.8)	58.0 (14.4)	67.2 (19.6)	73.4 (23.0)	85.0 (29.4)	85.7 (29.8)	75.7 (24.3)	60.6 (15.9)	45.1 (7.3)	36.1 (2.3)	59.6 (15.3)
Daily mean °F (°C)	30.6 (−0.8)	33.9 (1.1)	40.1 (4.5)	46.4 (8.0)	54.6 (12.6)	60.2 (15.7)	68.2 (20.1)	68.3 (20.2)	59.8 (15.4)	47.9 (8.8)	37.2 (2.9)	30.3 (−0.9)	48.1 (8.9)
Mean daily minimum °F (°C)	24.5 (−4.2)	26.3 (−3.2)	30.6 (−0.8)	34.8 (1.6)	41.9 (5.5)	46.9 (8.3)	51.4 (10.8)	50.9 (10.5)	43.9 (6.6)	35.2 (1.8)	29.3 (−1.5)	24.4 (−4.2)	36.7 (2.6)
Record low °F (°C)	−26 (−32)	−25 (−32)	−4 (−20)	10 (−12)	22 (−6)	27 (−3)	29 (−2)	31 (−1)	11 (−12)	3 (−16)	−15 (−26)	−29 (−34)	−29 (−34)
Average precipitation inches (mm)	2.03 (52)	1.72 (44)	1.90 (48)	1.55 (39)	1.66 (42)	1.33 (34)	0.52 (13)	0.42 (11)	0.62 (16)	1.53 (39)	2.46 (62)	2.66 (68)	18.40 (467)
Average snowfall inches (cm)	6.4 (16)	3.2 (8.1)	1.6 (4.1)	0.2 (0.51)	0.0 (0.0)	0.0 (0.0)	0.0 (0.0)	0.0 (0.0)	0.0 (0.0)	0.1 (0.25)	3.9 (9.9)	10.8 (27)	26.2 (67)
Average precipitation days (≥ 0.01 in)	11.9	9.4	11.0	10.1	8.7	8.2	3.6	3.4	4.2	8.3	12.9	12.4	104.1
Average snowy days (≥ 0.1 in)	4.3	2.2	1.4	0.2	0.0	0.0	0.0	0.0	0.0	0.0	2.1	5.4	15.6
Source: NOAA

== Demographics ==
Historical population
Census	Pop.	Note	%±
1890	248		—
1900	379		52.8%
1910	767		102.4%
1920	714		−6.9%
1930	633		−11.3%
1940	596		−5.8%
1950	660		10.7%
1960	585		−11.4%
1970	569		−2.7%
1980	572		0.5%
1990	552		−3.5%
2000	648		17.4%
2010	550		−15.1%
2020	598		8.7%
U.S. Decennial Census

=== 2010 census ===
As of the 2010 census, there were 550 people, 228 households, and 151 families residing in the town. The population density was 887.1 inhabitants per square mile (342.5/km^{2}). There were 270 housing units at an average density of 435.5 per square mile (168.1/km^{2}). The racial makeup of the town was 96.5% White, 0.7% African American, 0.4% Native American, 0.2% Asian, 0.9% from other races, and 1.3% from two or more races. Hispanic or Latino of any race were 4.2% of the population.

There were 228 households, of which 28.5% had children under the age of 18 living with them, 49.6% were married couples living together, 11.8% had a female householder with no husband present, 4.8% had a male householder with no wife present, and 33.8% were non-families. 27.6% of all households were made up of individuals, and 14.1% had someone living alone who was 65 years of age or older. The average household size was 2.41 and the average family size was 2.89.

The median age in the town was 43.4 years. 24.4% of residents were under the age of 18; 6% were between the ages of 18 and 24; 21.1% were from 25 to 44; 31.9% were from 45 to 64; and 16.5% were 65 years of age or older. The gender makeup of the town was 50.5% male and 49.5% female.

=== 2000 census ===
As of the 2000 census, there were 648 people, 246 households, and 167 families residing in the town. The population density was 1,059.1 per square mile (408.9/km^{2}). There were 272 housing units at an average density of 444.6 per square mile (171.7/km^{2}). The racial makeup of the town was 96.14% White, 0.15% African American, 2.16% Native American, 0.31% Asian, 0.31% from other races, and 0.93% from two or more races. Hispanic or Latino of any race were 0.77% of the population.

There were 246 households, out of which 39.4% had children under the age of 18 living with them, 54.1% were married couples living together, 10.2% had a female householder with no husband present, and 32.1% were non-families. 28.9% of all households were made up of individuals, and 13.0% had someone living alone who was 65 years of age or older. The average household size was 2.63 and the average family size was 3.30.

In the town, the age distribution of the population shows 32.1% under the age of 18, 5.4% from 18 to 24, 27.6% from 25 to 44, 23.1% from 45 to 64, and 11.7% who were 65 years of age or older. The median age was 36 years. For every 100 females, there were 103.1 males. For every 100 females age 18 and over, there were 99.1 males.

The median income for a household in the town was $33,214, and the median income for a family was $37,750. Males had a median income of $30,962 versus $20,625 for females. The per capita income for the town was $14,121. About 11.0% of families and 12.8% of the population were below the poverty line, including 22.4% of those under age 18 and 3.6% of those age 65 or over.

== Education ==
The Rosalia School District was honored with the Best School National Award for 2006.

== Media ==
Outdoor scenes for the 1992 film Toys were filmed in the Palouse region of the eastern part of the state, near Rosalia.
