= George Wright (general) =

Union United States Army general

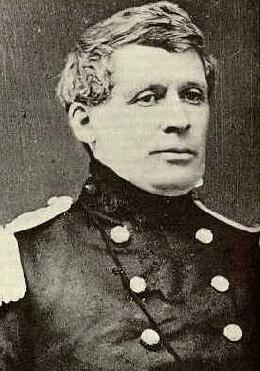
- Born: October 22, 1803; Norwich, Vermont
- Died: July 30, 1865 (aged 61); Brother Jonathan, near Crescent City, California
- Burial place: Sacramento Historic City Cemetery, Sacramento, California
- Military career
- Allegiance: United States of America; Union
- Branch: United States Army; Union Army
- Service years: 1822–1865
- Rank: Brigadier General
- Commands: 9th Infantry Regiment; Department of Oregon; District of Southern California; Department of the Pacific; District of California; Department of the Columbia
- Known for: Spokane horse slaughter
- Conflicts: Second Seminole War; Mexican–American War; Siege of Veracruz; Battle of Cerro Gordo; Battle of Contreras; Battle of Churubusco; Battle of Molino del Rey; Yakima War; Battle of Four Lakes; Battle of Spokane Plains; American Civil War

George Wright (October 22, 1803 – July 30, 1865) was an American soldier who served in the Mexican–American War and the American Civil War.

== Early life and career ==
Wright was born in Norwich, Vermont, the son of Roswell Wright and Jemima (Rose) Wright. Wright's family had an extensive military background; his father was a veteran of the War of 1812 and Norwich University founder Alden Partridge was related to his mother. Wright graduated from West Point in 1822 and was commissioned as a second lieutenant of Infantry.

He served in the 3rd U.S. Infantry Regiment on the frontier in Wisconsin and Maine. In 1838 he transferred to the 8th US Infantry Regiment and served on the Canada–US border. In 1844, he fought in Florida against the Seminoles where he was appointed brevet major for meritorious service. During the Mexican–American War, he served with the 8th Infantry at Vera Cruz and at the Battle of Molino del Rey, where he was wounded. For this service he was appointed a brevet colonel.

In 1848 he was promoted to major, and then lieutenant colonel in 1855, when he transferred to the 4th Infantry Regiment and served on the West Coast. Later in 1855 he was promoted to colonel and sent to Fort Monroe, Virginia to recruit the 9th Infantry Regiment, which, when at strength, was sent to the Washington Territory.

=== Washington Territory ===
In 1858 Wright oversaw the construction of Fort Dalles in Oregon Territory from a wood outpost to a more substantial base while in command. He fought in the Yakima War in 1855–56. In 1858, in retaliation for the Steptoe Battle, he soundly defeated the combined tribes in the Battle of Four Lakes and the Battle of Spokane Plains near Spokane. On September 23, 1858, after signing agreements with the Coeur d'Alenes, Wright was in camp near Latah (Hangman's) Creek, near present-day Spokane, Washington. He had in custody Chief Owhi, regarded as a perpetrator of the attacks on white settlers which led to the Yakima War. Wright sent for Owhi's son, Qualchan, also considered a perpetrator, threatening to hang Owhi unless Qualchan came to the camp. When Qualchan rode in the next day, he was taken into custody and hung within 15 minutes. Wright issued the orders to hang him, telling Captain James Allen Hardie to carry out the duty.

After the Battle of Spokane Plains, troops commanded by Wright were responsible for killing upwards of 900 Indian horses in retaliation of the uprising. The horse killings were designed to prevent further uprisings and to limit opportunities for the tribes to hunt and fend for themselves over the winter. Wright later expressed remorse over the killings, but deemed his actions necessary. He later wrote, “The chastisement which these Indians have received has been severe but well merited… A blow has been struck which they will never forget.”

== Civil War ==
At the beginning of the Civil War, Wright was the commanding officer of the Department of Oregon. Then, for a few months in 1861, he was the commanding officer of the District of Southern California. In October 1861, he was promoted to brigadier general of Volunteers and placed in command of the Department of the Pacific, replacing Edwin Vose Sumner, on Sumner's recommendation.

Although Wright would have preferred to have been sent East during the Civil War, he remained in California, where he commanded the largest force ever in the Far West—6,000 troops in 1862. His duties included protecting the frontier, keeping watch on secessionists, safeguarding the coast, and moving troops eastward.

The climate of San Francisco was not agreeable to Wright because of his asthma, and he wanted to move the headquarters to Sacramento. The headquarters did not move, although Wright did spend time in Sacramento.

== Postbellum ==
When the regular army reorganized in 1865 and created the Military Division of the Pacific, Wright commanded the District of California for a few months until he was given command of the newly created Department of the Columbia. He may have been removed from command of the Department of the Pacific in order for the Army to have a position for Maj. Gen. Irvin McDowell.

Wright and his wife died at sea en route to his new command when the steamer Brother Jonathan was wrecked off the California coast. His body was recovered six weeks later. He is interred in the Sacramento Historic City Cemetery.

For his service as commander of the Department of the Pacific, he was appointed a brevet brigadier general in the regular army.

== Namesake ==
Fort George Wright, located near Spokane, was named in his honor.

Wright's Point, a Harney County, Oregon landmark, was named for him.

Fort George Wright Drive in Spokane was renamed Whistalks Way in 2020. The name change acknowledges the brutality imposed on Native American tribes in Spokane by Col. George Wright. The new name honors Whist-alks, a woman warrior and Spokane Indian who played a role in the resistance against Wright in 1858.

On Fairchild Air Force Base in Washington, the 92nd Air Refueling Wing's residential neighborhood, Fort Wright Village, and a street, Fort Wright Oval, were named after George Wright. They were renamed in 2022.

Colonel Wright Elementary School, in The Dalles, Oregon, was named for him. The school is in the process of changing its name.

== Family ==
In 1827, Wright married Margaret Wallace Foster (or Forster). They had five children, four sons and one daughter. Their first son, Thomas, was born in 1830 and, in 1874, was killed in the Modoc War. Eliza (Elizabeth) was born in May 1837 and was married to Army Captain P.A. Owen. John, the youngest, was born in 1839 and rose to the rank of Brigadier General of the Army. He also served as Chief Marshall of the U.S. Supreme Court. Two sons did not survive childhood: James Heron, born in 1832, died at age five, and Roswell, born in 1834, died at age one year, nine months.

== See also ==
- List of American Civil War generals (Union)
