= Edward Steptoe =

American army officer (1815–1865)

Edward Jenner Steptoe
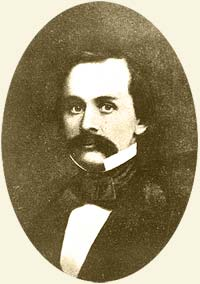
- Lt. Col. Edward Jenner Steptoe
- Born: November 7, 1815; Bedford County, Virginia
- Died: April 1, 1865 (aged 49); Lynchburg, Virginia
- Burial place: Presbyterian Cemetery, Lynchburg, VA; 37.402320°N 79.139244°W
- Military career
- Allegiance: United States of America
- Branch: United States Army
- Service years: 1837 – 1861
- Rank: Lieutenant Colonel
- Conflicts: Mexican-American War: Siege of Vera Cruz; Battle of Cerro Gordo; Battle of San Antonio Garita; Battle of Buena Vista; Battle of Chapultepec; Indian Wars (Spokane – Coeur d'Alene – Paloos War): Battle of Pine Creek

Edward Jenner Steptoe (November 7, 1815 – April 1, 1865) was an officer in the United States Army who served in the Mexican-American War and the Indian Wars. He is primarily remembered for his defeat at the Battle of Pine Creek in May 1858 during the Spokane-Coeur d'Alene-Paloos War. At Pine Creek Steptoe and 164 men were ambushed by over 1,000 Indian warriors. The battle, and the subsequent (successful) retreat, is also known as "the Steptoe Disaster."

== History ==
Steptoe was born in Virginia and graduated from West Point on July 1, 1837. He first saw action in Florida fighting against the Seminoles.

From 1838 to 1842, Steptoe fought extensively in the Seminole War. During the Mexican-American War, he participated in the Siege of Vera Cruz, and fought in the Battles of Cerro Gordo, San Antonio Garita, Buena Vista, and Chapultepec. After Cerro Gordo he was promoted to brevet major, and following Chapultepec he was promoted to brevet lieutenant colonel.

In 1854 he was sent by the War Department to Utah to investigate the recent massacre of John W. Gunnison and his survey party. In particular he was to determine the truth of rumors that Mormons had colluded with the Indians in the ambush. Steptoe charged eight Paiute Indians for the attack and three were convicted of manslaughter. He did not uncover evidence of Mormon involvement.

Late in 1854, President Franklin Pierce offered Steptoe the governorship of the Utah Territory to replace Brigham Young. Steptoe did not receive the actual letter from Pierce until March 1855. By that time he had already decided to turn down the offer. Instead, he was promoted to Major of the newly formed 9th Infantry Regiment.

In May 1858, during the Spokane–Coeur d'Alene–Paloos War, a combined force of about 1,000 Coeur d’Alenes, Spokanes, and Palouses attacked and defeated a force of 164 US troops under Steptoe at the Battle of Pine Creek.

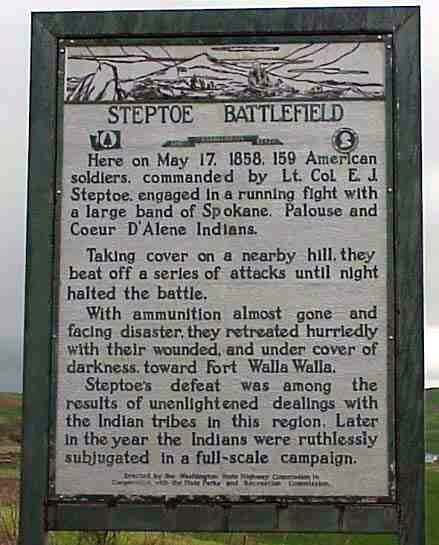
Marker at the Steptoe Battlefield near Rosalia, Washington

Steptoe was sent on sick leave after the battle, during which he was promoted to lieutenant colonel, and resigned due to ill health in November 1861. He died four years later in his home state of Virginia. He is buried in Lynchburg, Virginia, where his tombstone is marked: "Edward J. Steptoe, Lieut. Col., Army of the United States."

== Geographic features named after Steptoe ==
- Steptoe, Washington
- Steptoe Butte
- Steptoe Valley

== See also ==
- George Armstrong Custer
- George Wright
- Indian Wars
- Battle of Pine Creek
