= Tucannon River =

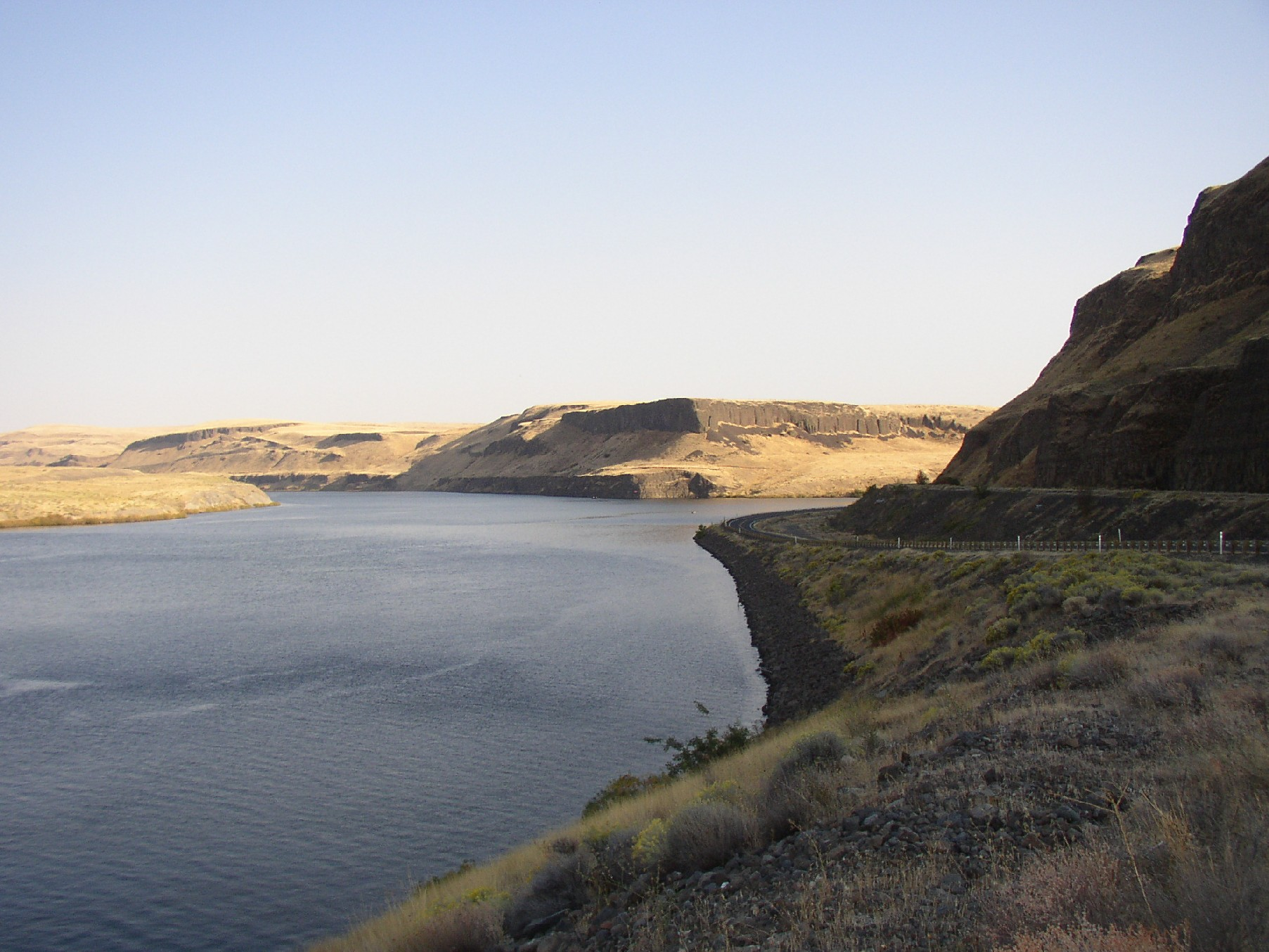
- Confluence of the Tucannon with the Snake River

- Location of the mouth of Tucannon River in Washington
- Etymology: Nez Perce place name for "digging", in this case the edible root of the camas

Location
- Country: United States
- State: Washington
- County: Columbia County, Garfield County

Physical characteristics
- Source: near Diamond Peak
  - location: Blue Mountains, Umatilla National Forest, Garfield County
  - coordinates: 46°07′11″N 117°30′41″W
  - elevation: 6,189 ft (1,886 m)
- Mouth: Snake River
  - location: near Starbuck, Columbia County
  - coordinates: 46°33′28″N 118°10′35″W
  - elevation: 541 ft (165 m)
- Length: 62.3 mi (100.3 km)
- Basin size: 502 sq mi (1,300 km^{2})
- Discharge
  - location: near Starbuck, 7.9 miles (12.7 km) from the mouth
  - average: 170 cu ft/s (4.8 m^{3}/s)
  - minimum: 15 cu ft/s (0.42 m^{3}/s)
  - maximum: 7,980 cu ft/s (226 m^{3}/s)

The Tucannon River is a tributary of the Snake River in the U.S. state of Washington. It flows generally northwest from headwaters in the Blue Mountains of southeastern Washington to meet the Snake 4 miles (6 km) upstream from Lyons Ferry Park and the mouth of the Palouse River. The Tucannon is about 62 miles (100 km) long. Part of the upper river flows through the Wenaha–Tucannon Wilderness.

== Watershed ==
The Tucannon basin of 502 square miles (1,300 km^{2}) ranges in elevation from about 540 feet (165 m) above sea level at the mouth on the Snake River to about 6,400 feet (1,950 m) in the Umatilla National Forest of the Blue Mountains.

River flows in the Tucannon basin depend solely on precipitation and groundwater. Studies in the early 1990s suggested that these flows would not be able to meet all of the claims, public and private, on the water resources of the lower river. In particular, farm irrigation projects were competing with fisheries for limited water. The Washington Department of Ecology named the Tucannon basin a Watershed Resource Inventory Area (WRIA) and in 1995 began hearings about how to allocate the water.

== History ==
=== Native peoples ===
The lower Snake River was home to bands of the Palouse and other Sahaptin-speaking people, including Nez Perce, Yakama, Walla Walla, Umatilla, and Wanapum. The Blue Mountains formed the western part of a 17,000,000-acre (69,000 km^{2}) region traditional to the aboriginal Nimi'ipuu people, renamed Nez Perce by Lewis and Clark when they arrived in the region in 1805. The horse was central to the lives of both the Palouse and the Nez Perce.

The Nez Perce Trail followed part of the Touchet and Tucannon rivers, extending east from Wallula and reaching the Touchet below Waitsburg. From there it followed the southern bank of the Touchet River to present day Dayton. Here it crossed the river and followed Patit Creek northeast.

=== Lewis and Clark expedition ===
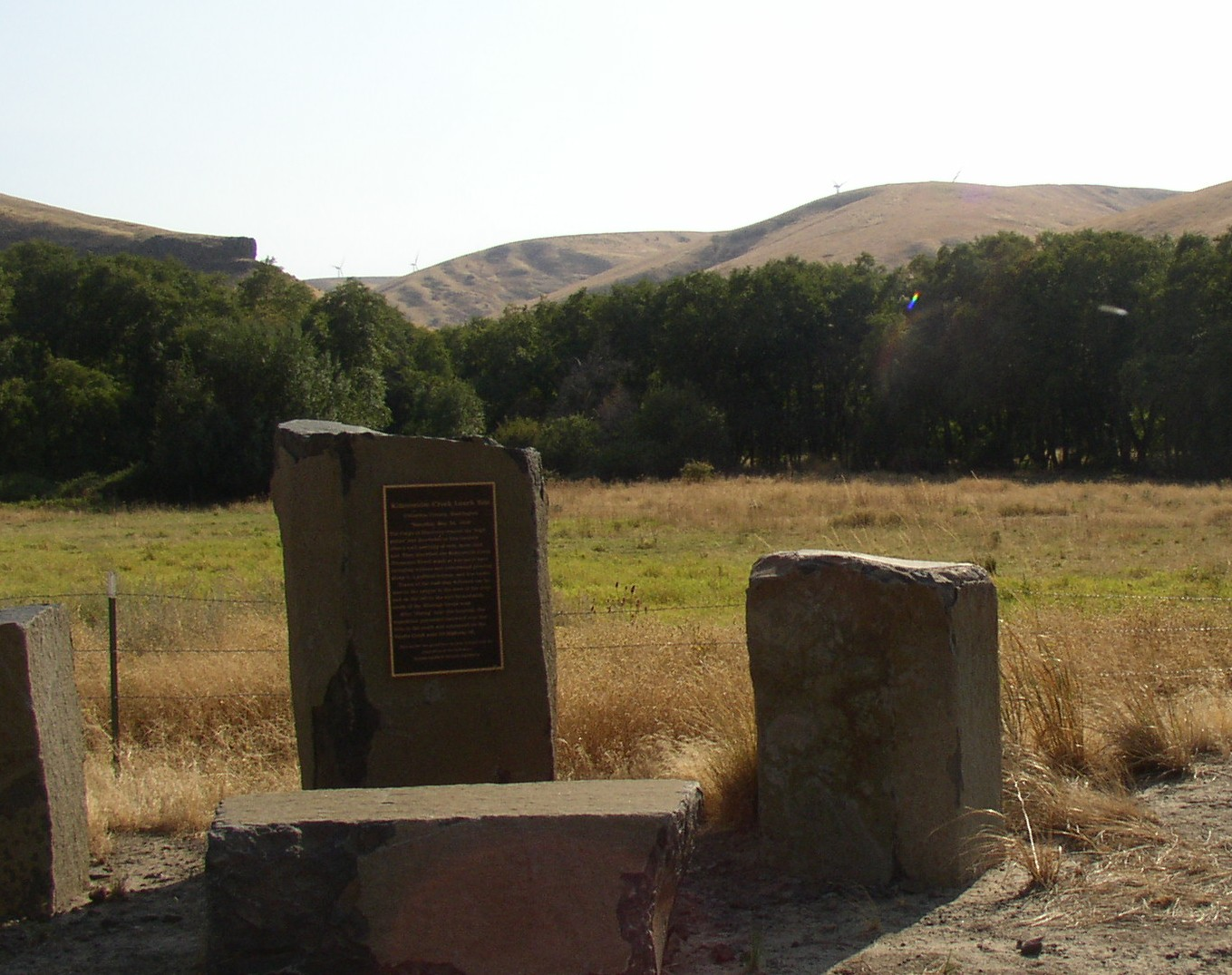
Point where Lewis and Clark entered the Tucannon River valley

On October 12, 1805, after a difficult passage through Snake River rapids, Lewis and Clark passed through a shorter rapids just east of the mouth of the Tucannon. Lewis wrote, "This we called called Kimooenim creek". The expedition did not stop, but continued down the Snake in dugouts.

On their return trip to St. Louis on May 2, 1806, Lewis and Clark followed the Nez Perce Trail, crossing over from Patit Creek about 2.5 miles (4.0 km) east of present-day Dayton to meet the Tucannon. Only 12 miles (19 km) beyond their campsite they reached the stream.

This creek rises in the southwest [Blue] mountains, and though only twelve yards wide discharges a considerable body of water into Lewis' river (the Snake River), a few miles above the narrows. Its bed is pebbled... (I)n its narrow bottoms are found some cottonwood, willow and the underbrush which grows equally on the east branch of the Wollawollah [Touchet].

Lewis and Clark camped on the Pataha Creek (a tributary to the Tucannon), which is recorded as the first locality for some distance where they were able to find ample firewood.

=== British fur trade ===
The fur industry was important in the region. The Tucannon River provided a profitable area for beaver and otter trapping, which were abundant. F. A. Shaver's 1906 book, An Illustrated History of Southeastern Washington, said that prior to 1834 the British Hudson's Bay Company (HBC) (the British fur-trading company) personnel were "undisputed occupants since 1829." A party was led by John Work, who served as an agent of the HBC. Starting from Fort Nez Perce in September 1831, Work and a 56-person party followed the Nez Perce Trail to the Upper Snake River country.

=== American survey and settlement ===
In the late winter of 1834, Captain Benjamin Bonneville crossed the Tucannon on the Nez Perce Trail, surveying the Northwest on behalf of the United States government.

A number of wagon roads were built through the area in the 1860s (including one between Walla Walla, Washington, and Lewiston, Idaho, in 1862). Settlers slowly drifted into the Tucannon River area in the 1860s, but in the early 1870s settlement rapidly increased.

=== Cayuse War ===
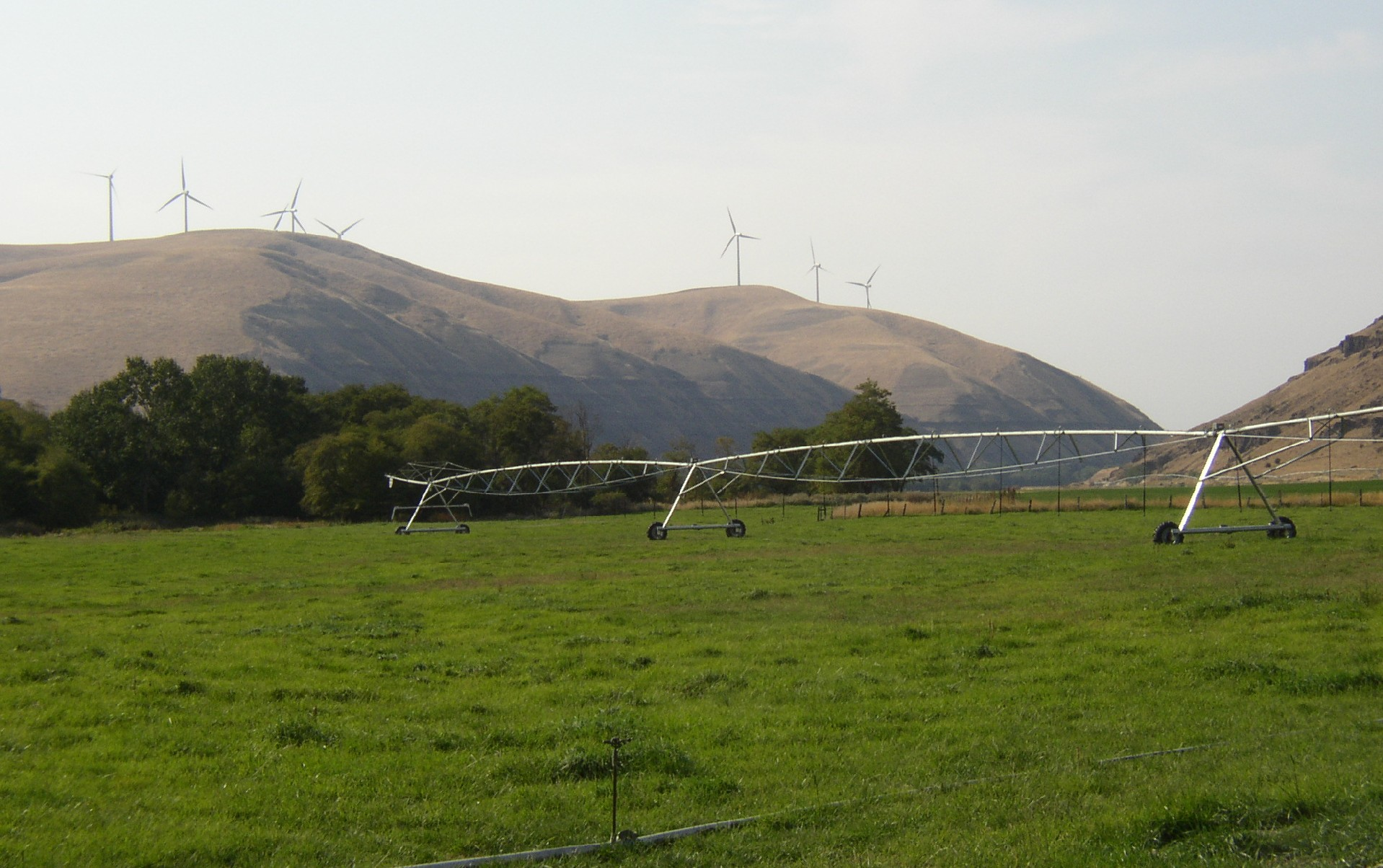
Agriculture in the Tucannon River Valley. Wind turbines line the ridge above.

In 1848, during the Cayuse War Captain Lawrence Hall's Company fought an engagement with the Cayuse on the Tucannon River:

Returning to Waiilatpu, the best mounted and equipped of the riflemen, and Hall's company among them, were selected for an expedition against the Cayuse Indians, whose exact location was at this time unknown. The object was to bring the Indians to terms by some means, by fighting or otherwise, and recapture the stock stolen from the whites. The expedition started about the 10th of March, 1848, and after a search of ten days or so found the enemy encamped on the Tucannon River, about four miles above its confluence with the Snake. The enemy adopted the ruse of hoisting a white flag, asked for and had a talk with the troops, anti pretended not to belong to the hostile party; but, upon the whites taking charge of the stock of the murdered pioneers, which were herding on the adjacent hills, the wily foe threw off the mask, and began an impetuous attack. The troops, greatly outnumbered, fought on the defensive, marching in retreat, formed in a hollow square, to resist the assaults made on all sides. The first night the captured stock was turned loose. The next morning the attack and retreat continued, and the Indians, as the Touchet River crossing was approached, took possession of it, attempting thereby to cutoff [sic] the retreat of the troops effectually. Here nothing but the most determined charge and fighting drove off the Indians and enabled the whites to cross that river and thus escape threatened extermination.

=== Coeur d'Alene War ===
During the Coeur d'Alene War on August 7, 1858, Captain Erasmus D. Keyes with a detachment of dragoons was ordered to the Snake River to erect a fort at a crossing point near the Palouse River. He selected the mouth of Tucannon River to establish Fort Taylor (a supply depot which honored Captain Oliver H. P. Taylor—killed that same year while he served with Lt. Colonel Edward Steptoe against the Spokanes in April. On August 25 this point served as a crossing point for Colonel George Wright, who led a force of 570 men across the Snake. It took several days to find a path to ascend from the Snake valley into the badlands above; this journey led them to the Battle of Four Lakes on September 5.

=== Later ===
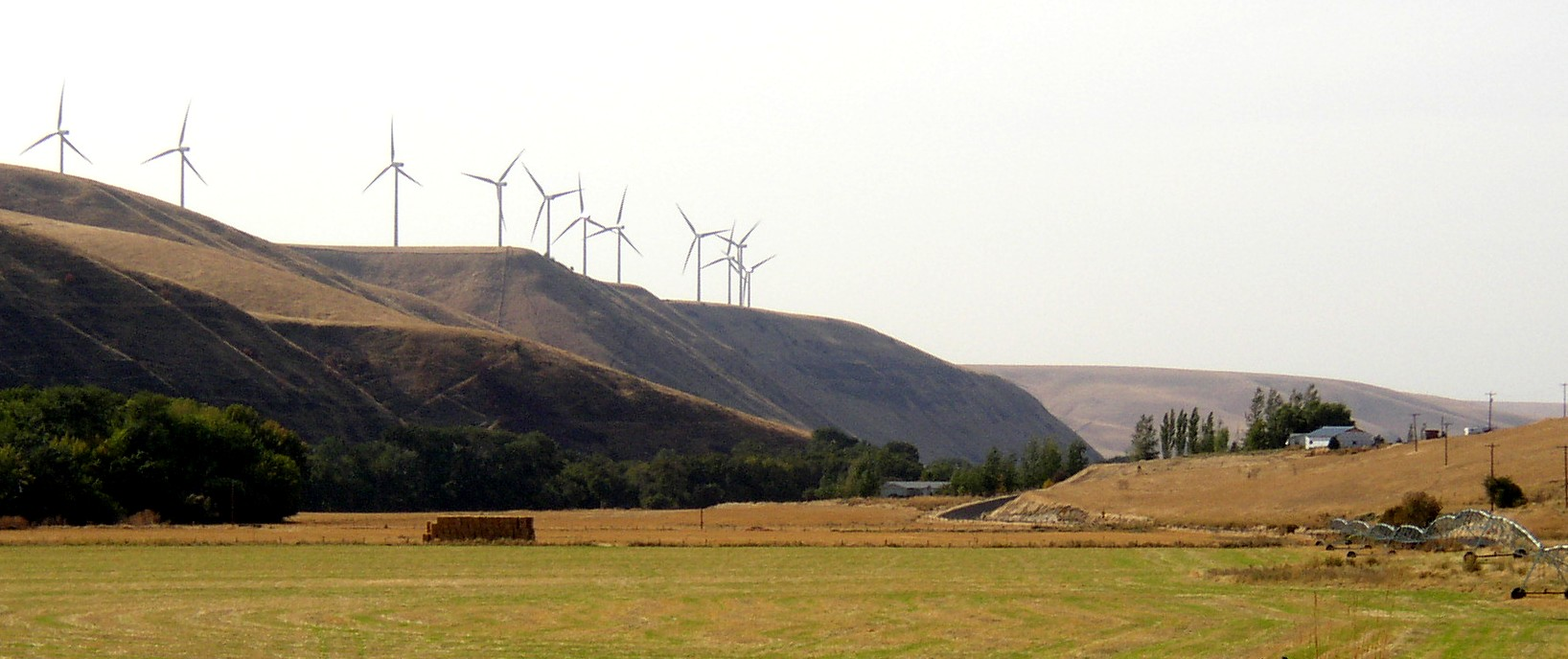
Wind turbines on Hopkins Ridge above the Tucannon River Valley

The railroad town of Starbuck on the Tucannon River was incorporated in the 1880s. In its early years Starbuck was a division point on the main line of the Oregon Railroad and Navigation Company. At one time up to 24 trains a day went through the town. Little Goose Dam, which became operational in 1975 was near Starbuck. It temporarily boosted the local population and labor force greatly as construction workers and their families moved into the town.

Blue Sky Wind built the Hopkins Ridge Wind Farm in Columbia County in 2005. Peak output from the project, bought by Puget Sound Energy and transmitted by the Bonneville Power Administration, is 150 megawatts (MW).

== Recreation ==
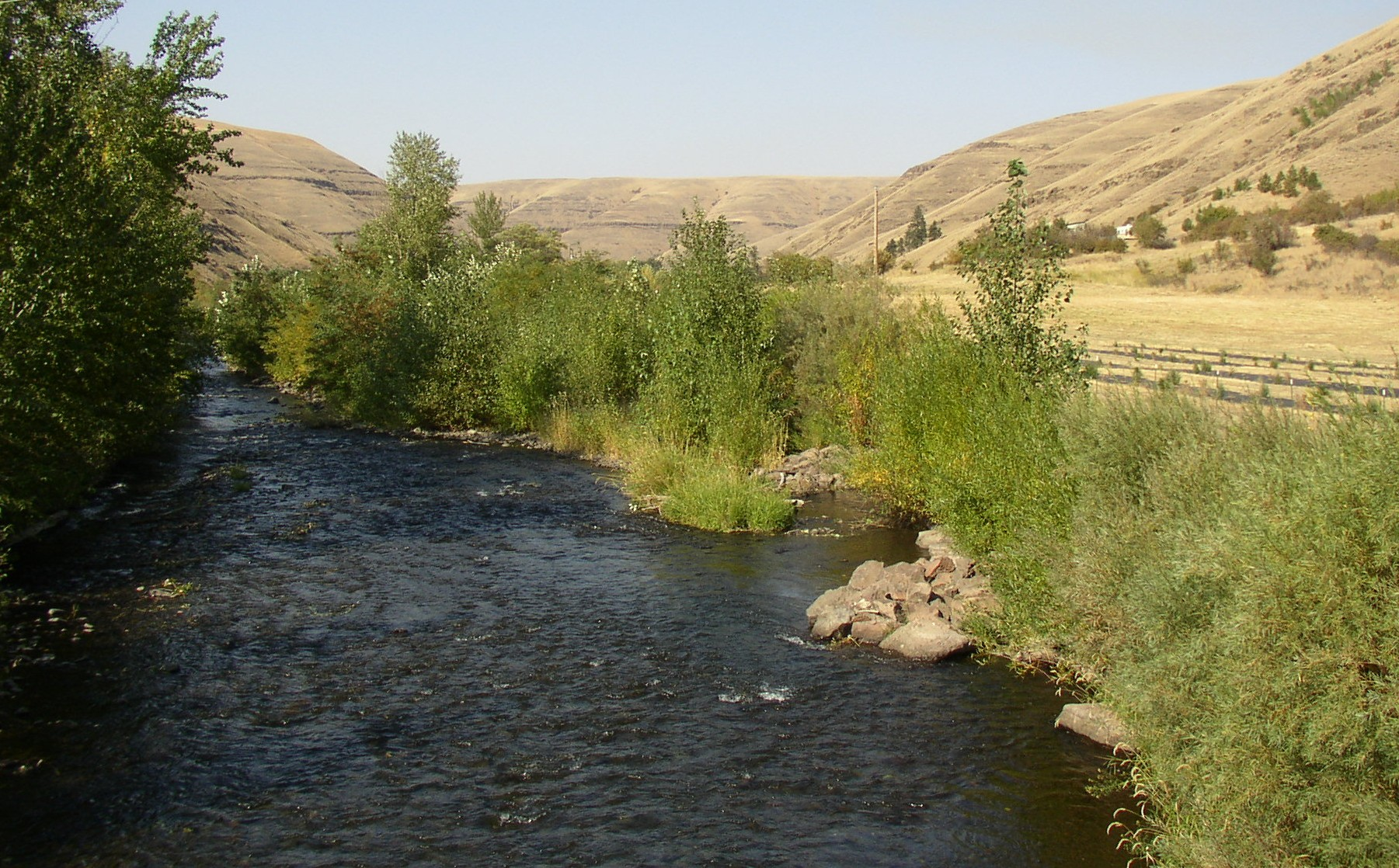
Tucannon River near its mid-point

All tributaries of the Tucannon River are closed to fishing, and sections of the Tucannon River are also closed to protect four federally listed threatened and endangered fish species: spring/summer and fall chinook salmon as well as bull trout and steelhead. The areas which are closed protect the main spawning grounds.

Steelhead may be caught, following prescribed fishing restrictions. The accessible areas of the Tucannon River are popular fishing areas. The Tucannon winds through national forest, state, and private lands, some of which are in stretches open to fishing. There are eight fishing ponds open to public fishing developed by the Washington Department of Fish and Wildlife and routinely stocked. Rainbow, Deer, Blue, Spring, Curl, Beaver, Watson and fly fishing-only Big Four Lake make up these trout-catching opportunities. Fishing access can also be gained at the Tucannon Fish Hatchery, where the river is bordered by state or national forest land.

The Tucannon Campground is operated by the U.S. Forest Service in the Tucannon River Valley as one of 15 campgrounds in the Pomeroy Ranger District.

Washington State Parks operates Camp Wooten Retreat Center on the upper Tucannon River. The center, near Pomeroy, offers cabins, dining and meeting halls, and other accommodations for large groups. Activities include hiking, canoeing on Donnie Lake, swimming in an indoor pool, archery, softball, tennis, and basketball.

== See also ==
- List of rivers of Washington (state)
- List of tributaries of the Columbia River
- Sheep Creek Falls
