= Alexander B. Mott =

American surgeon and soldier

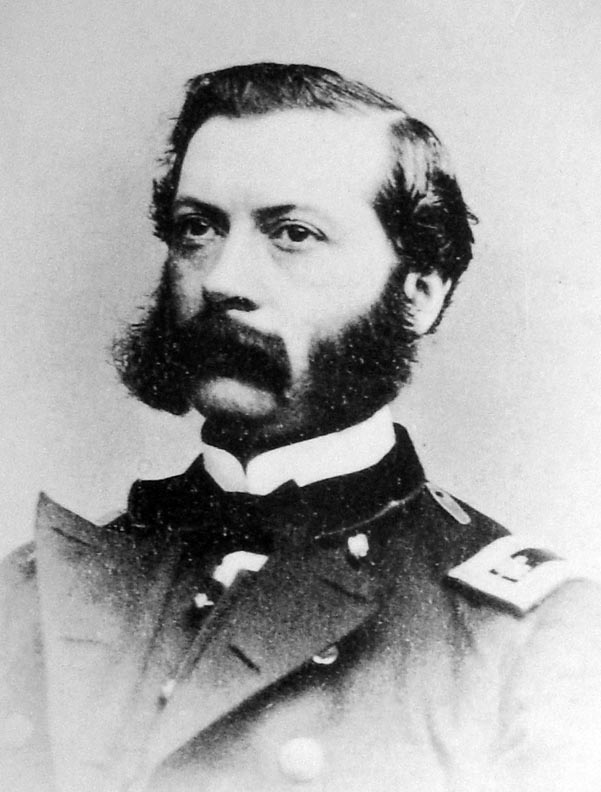
- Photographic portrait as a surgeon in the U.S. Volunteers (1861–1866)
- Born: March 31, 1826; New York City, New York
- Died: August 12, 1889 (aged 63); Yonkers, New York
- Spouses: Arabella Upsom Phelps. (m. 1851; death 1870); Minnie Mills Smith (m. 1875; div. 1877)
- Children: Valentine Mott
- Military career
- Allegiance: Union
- Branch: Union Army
- Service years: 1861–1866
- Rank: Major; Bvt. Colonel
- Conflicts: American Civil War

Alexander Brown Mott (March 31, 1826 – August 12, 1889) was an American surgeon and soldier.

== Early life ==
Alexander Brown Mott was born in New York City on March 31, 1826, the son of Dr. Valentine Mott and Louisa D. (Mums) Mott, and grandson of Dr. Henry Mott, a descendant from an English Quaker, who in 1660 settled on Long Island. He was educated privately by Professor William Darling, M.D., of the University Medical College of New York, and at the Columbia College Grammar School, there remaining until 1836, when he went to Europe with his parents. He remained abroad five years, and received a good classical education. In spite of his Quaker blood he had a great fondness for a military life, and on his return to New York he entered West Point, but abandoned this in deference to his father's wishes. He then passed a year in France and Germany about 1842, and occupied a position in the naval agency in Marseille. Two years after, Mott became the private secretary of Commodore Charles Morris, of the U.S. Navy, who was then in charge of the Mediterranean Squadron. He afterwards made a journey to Spain, and was present at the siege and surrender of Barcelona, and took part in the fighting in command of a battery. On his return to Marseille he was offered and accepted a position with a firm in that city, and during 1845 he was sent by them to Turkey, Greece, Piedmont, Italy, and Austria.

== Medical career ==
With his father's successful and brilliant career before him, he began to seriously consider entering the medical profession. He commenced his studies in medicine at Havre, and on his return to New York resumed them, in his father's office. He graduated from the New York Medical College in 1849; the University of Pennsylvania in 1850, and the Castleton Medical College in 1849, and besides he attended a course of lectures at the University Medical College. In 1849 he assisted in founding St. Vincent's Hospital, and in 1853 became visiting surgeon. Dr. Alexander Mott was appointed surgeon to the New York Dispensary in 1850. From 1855 to 1863 he was attending surgeon to the Jewish Hospital, and for fourteen years he was surgeon to the Charity Hospital. At the University Medical Clinic he performed many difficult surgical operations, where he acted as his father's prosector for a number of years. He was one of the founders of the Bellevue Medical College, where he at one time held the chair of surgical anatomy, and was professor of clinical and operative surgery from 1872 until his death. He was consulting surgeon to the bureau of medicine and surgical relief to the out-door poor, and in 1859–1884 he held the appointment of attending surgeon at Bellevue Hospital.

== Civil War ==
On the outbreak of the American Civil War he was given two hours' notice to proceed to Washington, D.C., with the first regiments of New York Militia on April 18, 1861. After organizing the medical corps of those regiments under his charge, he inspected the recruits for thirty-eight regiments of New York volunteers. As medical director of New York, more than 70,000 men passed under his supervision. He also inspected all the New York regiments around forts Monroe and Washington. Aided by some patriotic boomers of prominence in New York, in 1862 he founded the U.S. Army General Hospital, of which the surgeon general placed him at the head. He was appointed surgeon U.S. volunteers, and was one of the medical examining board for admission to the medical corps of the army for surgeons of volunteers. In 1864–65 he was medical inspector of the Department of Virginia, with headquarters with the Army of the James, under Major-General Edward Ord, and served under him until the war was at an end. Mott was present at the interview between Generals Robert E. Lee and U.S. Grant on the occasion of the signing of the agreement of surrender at Appomattox Court House, Virginia. After being on duty in Richmond, Virginia, he was mustered out of the U.S. service on August 1, 1866, and made brevet-colonel of the U.S. volunteers.

== Reputation ==
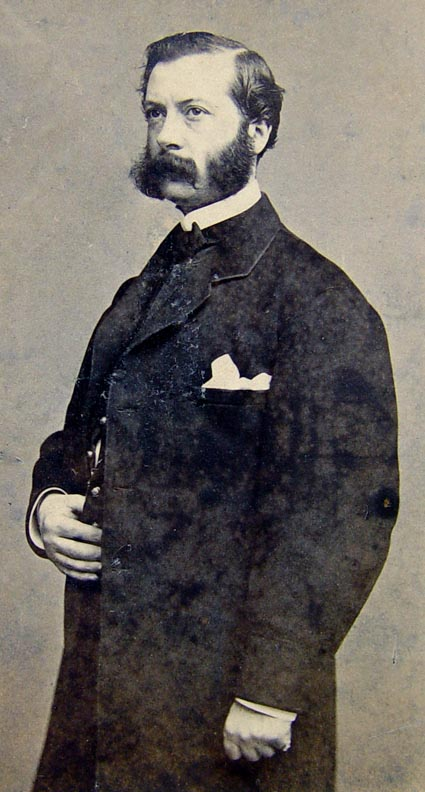
Carte de visite by Jeremiah Gurney (c. 1858–1869)

His father, Valentine Mott, possessed the qualities that made him famous for his operations; he was almost as dexterous with one hand as with the other, and to a great extent the son inherited his skill. His most difficult operations were amputations at hip-joint and exsection of ulna twice; tying the common carotid fifteen times; internal carotid twice; innominata once; subclavian four times; common iliac twice; internal iliac twice, and external iliac five times; resection of the femur three times; performing lithotomy twenty-one times; femoral eighteen times; and removal of the entire lower jaw for phosphor-necrosis twice. There have been published reports of other cases of interest treated by him. He was fellow of the American Geographical Society; member of the New York Academy of Sciences; of the New York Medico-Legal Society; of the New York Society for the Relief of Widows and Orphans of Medical Men; of the New York Physicians' Mutual Aid Association; a permanent member of the American Medical Association, and honorary member of the Hudson County Pathological Society.

== Personal life ==
Signatures
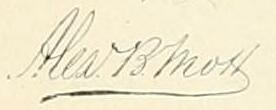
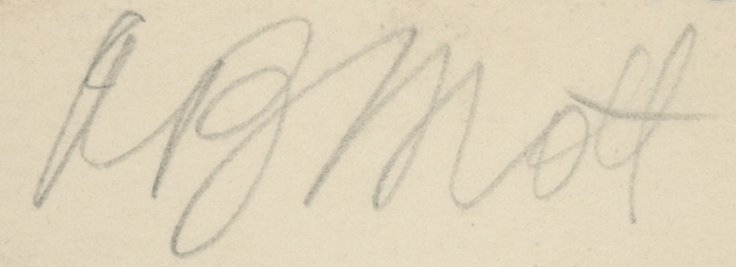

In 1851 he was married to Arabella Upsom, youngest daughter of Thaddeus Phelps, of New York, by whom he had one son, Valentine Mott, who became a physician of prominence in New York, and the fourth of the family in a direct line to follow the medical profession.

Arabella Mott died in the early 1870s in Italy due to "Roman Fever". He married a second time to Minnie Mills Smith on June 3, 1875 in St James NY. She was the daughter of Edmund Thomas and Amanda Moscrop (Mills) Smith of Nissequogue, NY.

Mott died in Yonkers, New York, on August 12, 1889.

== See also ==
- Thaddeus P. Mott
- Julia Pastrana

== Sources ==
- Shrady, John M. (1890). "In Memoriam.—Alexander Brown Mott". Transactions of the New York State Medical Association. Vol. 7. New York City, NY. pp. 543–46.
- "Obituary.—Alexander B. Mott, M.D.". The New York Times. New York, NY. Tuesday, August 13, 1889. p. 2.
- "Personal.—Funeral of Dr. A. B. Mott". The Standard Union. Brooklyn, NY. Friday, August 16, 1889. p. 2.

Attribution:
