= John H. Howell =

John H. Howell was a US Army artillery officer and commander of the 3rd New York Artillery which he led during the American Civil War, and served as chief artillery officer during the New York Draft Riots. He was born on August 24, 1887, in Wetzel County, West Virginia, USA.

== Early military career ==
Enlisting as an orderly sergeant, Howell served under Capt. Thomas H. Bates while stationed at an army battery in Utica, New York before his promotion to First Lieutenant. Wounded at the Battle of Fair Oaks, he returned home and later received an appointment as Captain of the 3rd Artillery and a staff officer under Gen. Henry Morris Naglee, later accompanying him to South Carolina.

== New York Draft Riots ==
During the New York Draft Riots, he along with Captain Thaddeus P. Mott and General Charles C. Dodge of the 8th Regiment Artillery, were dispatched amid reports of an estimated 5,000 rioters being assembled near Eighth Avenue and 32nd Street. Although initially driving the mob back, the rioters armed with stones, brickbats and slung-shot counterattacked when Mott attempted to cut down three nearby African-Americans who had been hung nearby. Although ordered by Mott to bring two howitzers on the corner of 32nd Street and Seventh Avenue in order to sweep the streets with grape and canister, Howell was unable to make his way pass the large crowd and both the regiments infantry and cavalry were ordered to clear the way. With bayonets and sabres, the regiment charged toward the rioters causing the mob to split into two groups and driven back. Approaching the crowd alone, he ordered them to disperse threatening to fire upon them. However, while the rioters refused to disperse, they neither made any movement against the regiment causing the officers to hesitated in giving the order to fire. The rioters, believing the officers would not fire, charged moments later throwing stones and debris at the soldiers. After it was seen by the officers that the rioter's intentions were to seize the regiments guns, the order was given to fire against the charging crowd. Although many rioters were badly injured or killed in the first bombardment, the rioters in the rear continued fighting until another five of six rounds had been fired. Fleeing down various side streets, the regiment split into separate columns and chased after the retreating mob arresting many of the rioters before returning to their Mulberry Street headquarters. Two days following the attack, Howell rode his carriage to the area when he was attacked by seven or eight men who had recognized his uniform. Calling around to others nearby, soon a group of nearly fifty were shouting for Howell to be hanged. As the crowd began after the driver to stop the carriage, Howell drew his revolver and forced the driver to turn down 31st Street and had the driver use his lash to whip the horses into a full run. As the crowd followed after them, Howell's carriage was assaulted by a shower of stones and brick-bats breaking in many of the carriage's panels. At one point, the carriage was surrounded and one man managed to climb onto the carriage from behind, before he fell off and was run over. Although avoiding serious injury, Howell suffered temporary paralysis of his arm when a stone struck an old wound he had previously suffered. he finally managed to escape after firing his revolver at the crowd from the back window.

== Later years ==
Howell later assumed command the 3rd Battery and remained at Newbern, North Carolina until late 1863 when it moved to Norfolk and then took part in the Carratuck campaign, being stationed at Great Bridge. The battery was eventually organized with the Army of the James, and was in the advance during all its movements before being The Battery was re-organized as a veteran organization on January 1, 1864.
