= Valentine Mott =

American surgeon

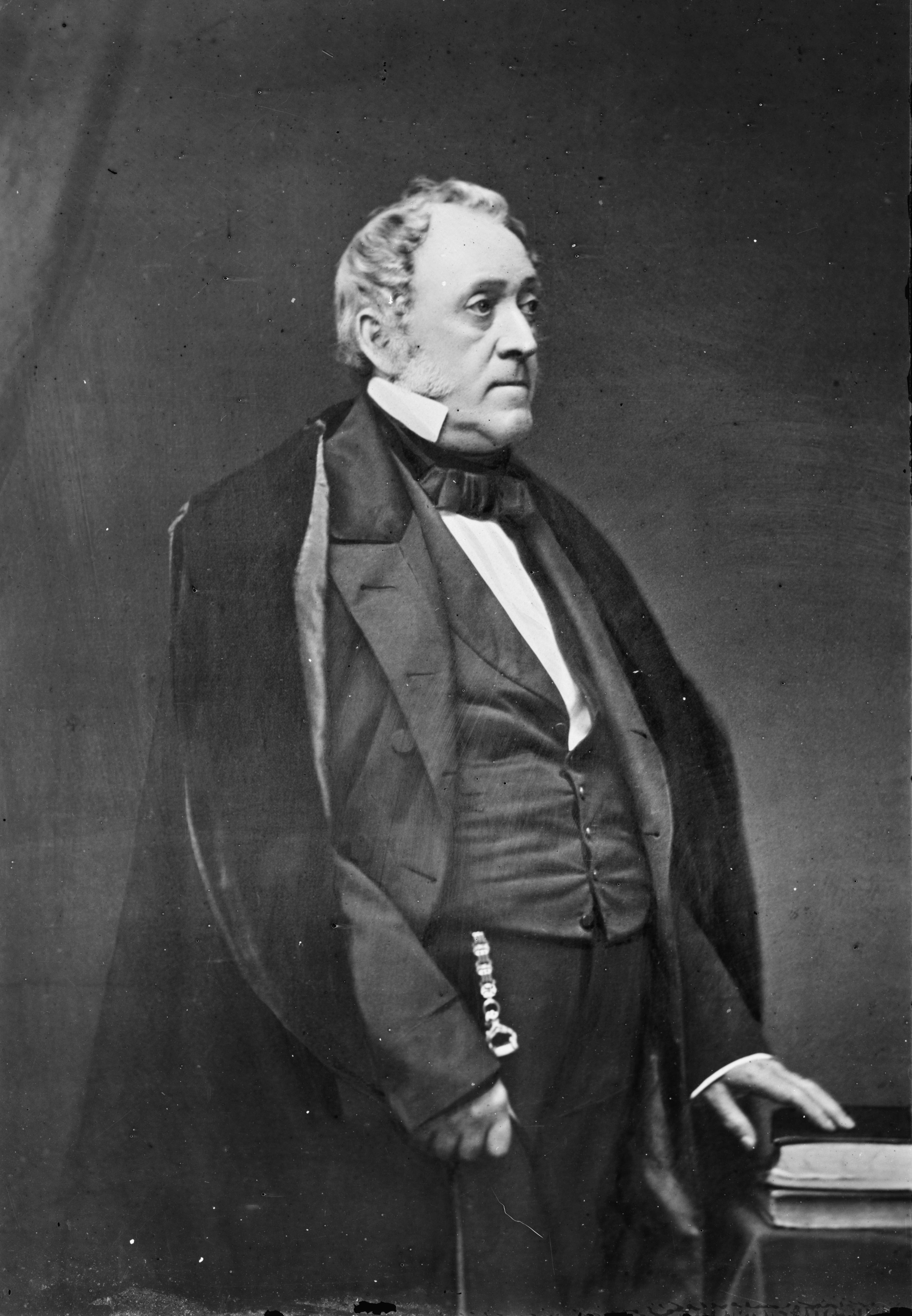
Dr. Valentine Mott (1855–65)

Valentine Mott (August 20, 1785 – April 26, 1865) was an American surgeon.

== Life ==
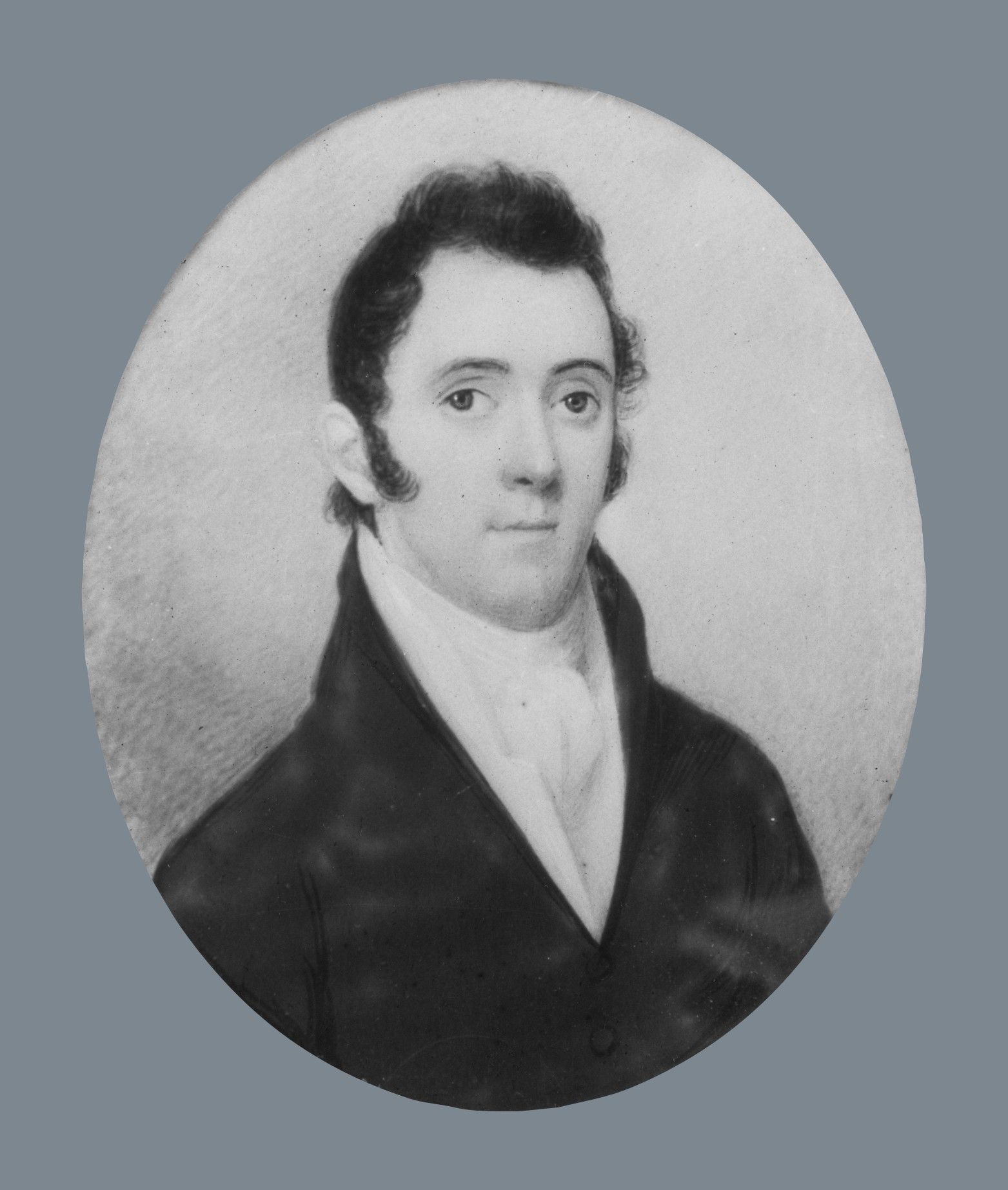
Dr. Valentine Mott by Anson Dickinson (c. 1820)

Valentine Mott was born at Glen Cove, New York. He graduated at Columbia College, studied under Sir Astley Cooper in London, and also spent a winter in Edinburgh. After acting as demonstrator of anatomy he was appointed professor of surgery in Columbia College in 1809. From 1811 to 1834 he was in very extensive practice as a surgeon, and most successful as a teacher and operator.

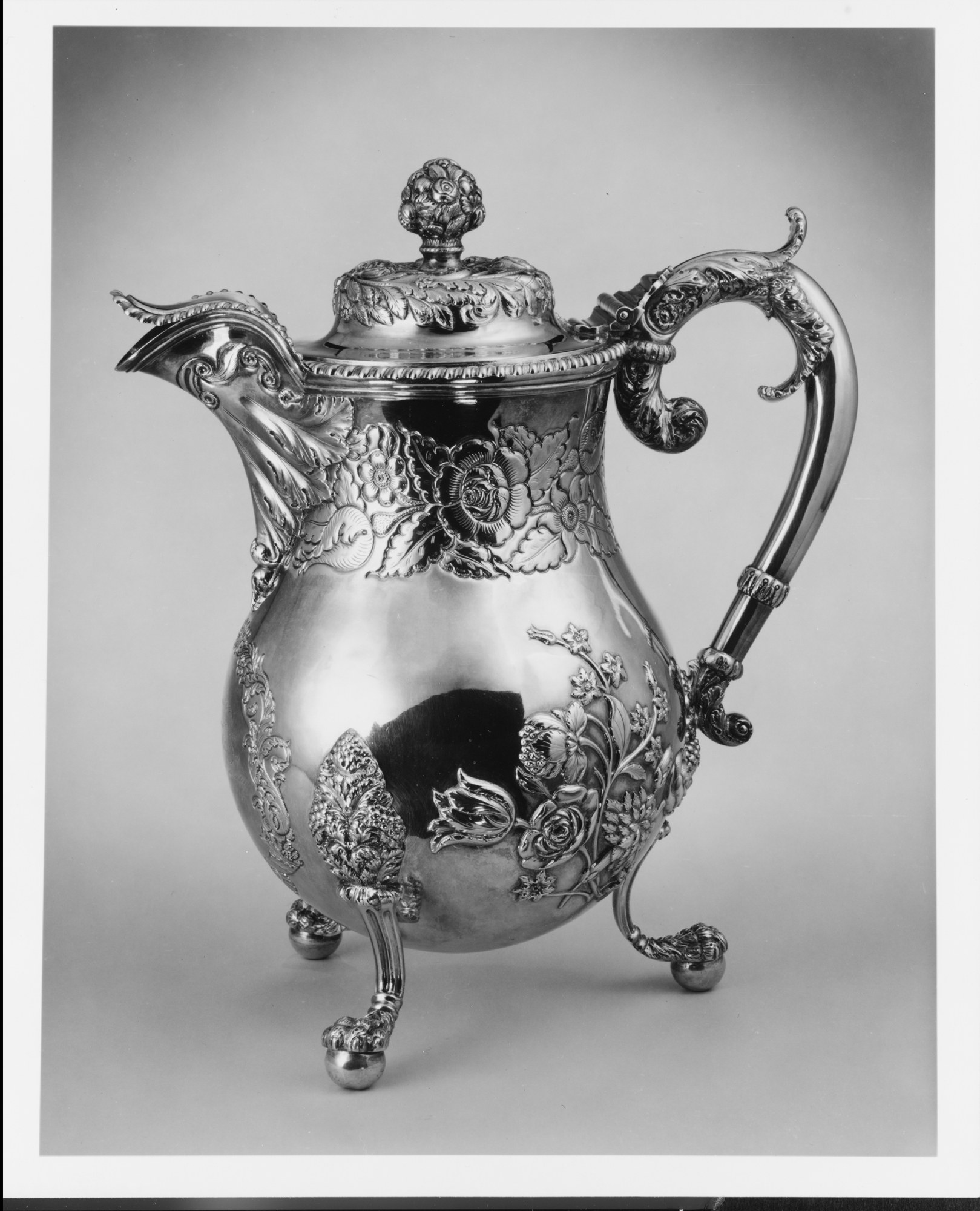
A silver ewer designed for Dr. Mott by Frederick Marquand in 1827. Now on permanent display at the Metropolitan Museum of Art

He tied the innominate artery in 1818; the patient lived twenty-six days. He performed a similar operation on the carotid for the first time in the USA on 20 Sept 1829 before going on to carry out this operation forty-six times with good results; and in 1827 he was also successful in the case of the common iliac. He is said to have performed one thousand amputations and one hundred and sixty-five lithotomies.

After spending seven years in Europe (1834-1841) Mott returned to New York where he was on the founding faculty of the university medical college of New York, now New York University School of Medicine. He translated AALM Velpeau's Operative Surgery, and was foreign associate of the Imperial Academy of Medicine of Paris.

A collection of his correspondence is held at the National Library of Medicine in Bethesda, Maryland.

== Family ==
In 1849, the same year he was elected President of the New York Academy of Medicine, Mott and his wife, the former Louisa Dunmore Munn, moved to a four-story Italianate brownstone mansion at #1 Gramercy Park West with their large family. The couple had 9 children: 6 sons, including Alexander Brown Mott (1826–1889), Valentine Mott, Jr. (1822–1854), and Thaddeus P. Mott; and 3 daughters, including Louisa Dunmore Mott, who in 1842 married the surgeon William Holme Van Buren. A son of Alexander B. Mott, the surgeon Dr. Valentine Mott (1852–1918) studied under Louis Pasteur in Paris and was the first to introduce rabies vaccine into the U.S.

Upon his death in 1865, Mott was interred at Green-Wood Cemetery in Brooklyn, New York.
