= William Holme Van Buren =

American surgeon

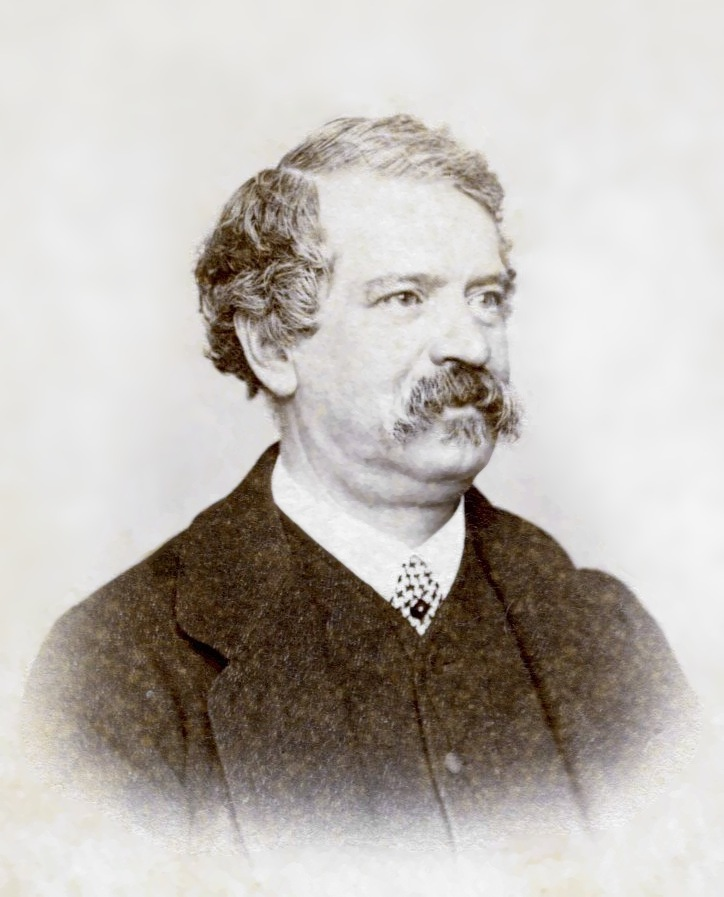
William Holme Van Buren

William Holme Van Buren (born in Philadelphia, 5 April 1819; died in New York City, 25 March 1883) was an American surgeon.

== Life ==
His grandfather was Abraham Van Buren, a son of John Beuren, a pupil of Herman Boerhaave, who emigrated to New York from Beuren, near Amsterdam, in 1700. Van Buren entered Yale College in 1834. Before graduation he left to take his medical education at the University of Pennsylvania, finishing his studies before the legal age at which a diploma could be awarded him. He spent some eighteen months in Paris and returned to receive his degree in medicine at the University of Pennsylvania in 1840, with a graduation thesis on "The Starch and Dextrin Bandage", the technique of which he had learned in Paris. He entered the army, passing the highest competitive examination.

He became a Catholic early in his medical career and remained one for the rest of his life. He was consulting surgeon to many of the prominent New York City hospitals, and had been president of the Pathological Society, vice-president of the New York Academy of Medicine, and corresponding member of the Société de Chirurgie of Paris, an honour that had been conferred on only one American before him.

In 1842 he married the daughter of Dr. Valentine Mott, and in 1845 received the appointment as pro-sector to the medical department of the University of New York under Dr. Mott. In 1852 he became professor of anatomy and remained in that position until the burning of the college building in 1865. He attempted to reorganize the university medical school after the fire, insisting on the erection of a building near Bellevue Hospital Center. His plans, all adopted later, being rejected, Dr. Van Buren resigned. In 1868 he became professor of surgery in the Bellevue Hospital Medical College, a position which he retained until his death.

== Works ==
In 1854 he translated from the French Charles Morel's Histology, and afterwards, Bernard and Huette's Operative Surgery. This latter work was furnished by the United States Government to the army surgeons during the Civil War. President Abraham Lincoln offered to make Van Buren Surgeon General at the time of the war, and on his refusal consulted him with regard to the appointment. In 1865 he published Contributions to Practical Surgery, in 1870 Lectures on Diseases of the Rectum, and in 1874, in conjunction with Dr. Edward Lawrence Keyes, a textbook on genito-urinary surgery. His contributions to medical periodical literature were frequent.
