= Camp Wooten Retreat Center =

Retreat center in the Blue Mountains, Washington

Coordinates: 46.238202°N 117.697413°W

Camp Wooten Retreat Center (formerly Camp Wooten Environmental Learning Center) is a group camp in the Washington State Park System located fifteen miles south of Pomeroy in Columbia County, Washington. It consists of a 1930s-era dining hall and many cabins and other facilities on the Tucannon River and Donnie Lake in the Blue Mountains. Available activities include indoor swimming, canoeing on the lake, hiking, archery and other athletic facilities.
