= Edward Lawrence Keyes =

American urologist

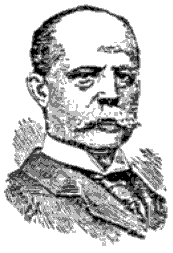
- Born: August 28, 1843; Fort Moultrie, South Carolina
- Died: January 24, 1924 (aged 80); New York City, New York
- Resting place: Gate of Heaven Cemetery
- Education: Yale College; New York University
- Occupation: Urologist
- Spouse: Sarah Loughborough (m. 1870)
- Children: Edward Loughborough Keyes

Edward Lawrence Keyes (August 28, 1843 – January 24, 1924) was a leading American urologist of the late 19th century and the first president of the American Association of Genitourinary Surgeons at its founding in 1888.

== Life ==
Keyes, a son of General Erasmus D. Keyes, was born August 28, 1843, at Fort Moultrie Army Base in Charleston, South Carolina. He studied at Yale College, 1859–1863, graduating with a master's degree, and briefly served as his father's aide-de-camp as a captain in the United States Army. After graduating from Medical College of the New York University, he entered into practice with one of his teachers, William Holme Van Buren. In 1870 he himself began lecturing on dermatology and genitourinary surgery at Bellevue Hospital Medical College.

== Family ==
Keyes married Sarah Loughborough on April 26, 1870. From 1881 to 1907 they lived at 930 Fifth Avenue, which they had decorated by John F. Douthitt and where Sarah hosted a salon.

Their son, Edward Loughborough Keyes, was like his father a noted urologist.

Edward Lawrence Keyes died from pneumonia at his home in New York on January 24, 1924. He was buried at Gate of Heaven Cemetery.

== Publications ==
- with William H. Van Buren, Surgical Diseases of the Genito-Urinary Organs Including Syphilis (1874)
- The Venereal Diseases Including Stricture of the Male Urethra (1880)
- with Charles H. Chetwood, Venereal Diseases: Their Complications and Sequelae (1900)
