= Laura Anderson Barbata =

Mexican artist (born 1958)

- Born: 1958 (age 67–68); Mexico City, Mexico
- Movement: Contemporary art

Laura Anderson Barbata (born 1958) is a Mexican contemporary artist. Based in Brooklyn and Mexico City, Barbata's work uses art and performance to encourage social justice by documenting traditions and involving communities in her practice.

== Early life and education ==
Laura Anderson Barbata was born 1958 in Mexico City, Mexico. She moved to Sinaloa, where her father was a restaurateur, and spent the early part of her childhood in Mazatlán with little or no access to museums.

When she was 10 years old, Barbata's family moved to Europe. The first museum her parents took her to was the Louvre. Deeply impacted by the Winged Victory of Samothrace, Barbata began to explore the world through drawing. She studied sculpture and engraving at the School of Visual Arts at the University of Rio de Janeiro and architecture in Mexico City.

== Work ==
Anderson has exhibited in the United States, Mexico, Europe, and South America. She is in the permanent collection and has shown at the Metropolitan Museum of Art, New York, NY; The Museum of Modern Art, Mexico City, Mexico; and the Museum of Modern Art, Rio de Janeiro, Brazil, among others. Barbata has organized projects in the Amazon of Venezuela, Trinidad and Tobago, Mexico, Norway and the USA. Among her current projects include The Repatriation of Julia Pastrana and her project Transcommunality (ongoing since 2001) with traditional stilt dancers from New York, West Africa, the Caribbean, and Oaxaca, Mexico.

Barbata's art is deeply entwined with social practice, community engagement, and postcolonial critique. For the Yanomami Paper Project, Barbata worked as an apprentice to the Yanomami Community in the Amazonas region of Venezuela. In return, she taught the community how to make books and paper from local resources. Barbata has continued to work with this community, producing books in the Yanomami language with drawings by the community's children. The Yanomami community continues to make their own papers and books. Some of these books are now held in collections including the Library of Congress, and the New York Public Library.

=== Transcommunality ===
In 2002, while working as an artist-in-residence in Trinidad and Tobago, Barbata was introduced to the founder of the Keylemanjahro School of Arts and Culture in Port-of-Spain. The school hosted an after school stilt dancing program open to all kids, intended to keep children out of trouble while also engaging them in the cultural tradition of stilt dancing to prepare for the annual NCBA Junior Carnival Parade. Barbata worked with Keylemanjahro for 5 years alongside the students and parents to create costumes for their performances.

The group worked with little to no resources and relied exclusively on the help of parents in the neighborhood. The children had been creating their costumes by painting their bodies with toxic house paint. Additionally, students participated in carnival with the same presentation every year, which excluded them from competing for character awards. Barbata suggest that the children could develop and create their own costumes to learn about the environment and other cultures, and worked with Keylemanjahro to discuss possible themes and design of characters for the kids to portray and compete.

In 2007, Barbata returned to New York and continued her work with stilt dancing by collaborating with the Brooklyn Jumbies, a group of stilt dancers from the West Indies and West Africa. Together they hosted Jumbie Camp, a workshop to train young stilt dancers and prepare for a street performance on 24th Street in Chelsea, and later for the West Indian American Junior Carnival Parade.

Barbata has continued to work with the Brooklyn Jumbies to extend outreach programs in different parts of the country, particularly in communities or areas that are populated by Mexican descendants and African-Americans. They have staged multiple spontaneous interventions around New York City. In 2011, Barbata and the Brooklyn Jumbies staged Intervention: Wall Street in response to the economic crisis. The performance took place in the financial district of New York. The Moko Jumbies walked on stilts in business suits towards Wall Street, while Barbata strolled and danced in front handing out gold-covered chocolate coins. The coins had the word Mexico on it. Intervention: Indigo took place in 2015 in Brooklyn, New York in response to violence against African American communities. The performance began at the Bushwick police precinct and ended in an area populated by artists. The performers were dressed in indigo-colored textiles inspired by the Danza de los Zancudos (traditional stilt dancers from Zaachila) from Oaxaca and the Dance of the Devils (Danza de los diablos) from the Afro-Mexican coast of Guerrero.

=== Julia Pastrana ===
In 2003, Barbata learned about Julia Pastrana when she was invited to collaborate on designs for the New York premiere of the play The True History of the Tragic Life and the Triumphant Death of Julia Pastrana, the Ugliest Woman in the World by Shaun Prendergast. Barbata felt deeply moved by Pastrana's story and drew a connection to her own childhood experience growing up in the same area of Mexico as Pastrana and dancing for money. Barbata's ultimate dream goal was that Pastrana should go back to Mexico and be buried.

In 2005, during a residency in Oslo, Barbata began petitioning the Institute of Forensic Medicine at the University of Oslo for Pastrana's repatriation. In September, she published an obituary for Pastrana in an Oslo newspaper that informed that there would be a catholic ceremony (faith that Ms. Pastrana practiced during her life). Barbata organized the catholic mass in memory of Julia Pastrana in the Cathedral of Oslo. The ceremony was attended by hundreds of people, many of whom were circus performers who brought her flowers.

Barbata sent documents making her case for Pastrana's release to Norway's National Committee for the Evaluation of Research on Human Remains. Barbata also wrote letters to the National Research Ethics Committee for the Social Sciences and Humanities, the Governor of Sinaloa in Mexico, the Foreign Affairs Department of Mexico, the University of Oslo, journalists, artists, and anthropologists. Many of these recipients became invested in the project.

In 2012, Governor Mario López Valdez of Sinaloa joined Barbata's cause and petitioned for Pastrana's repatriation. López Valdez sent a letter to the National Committee for Ethical Evaluation on Human Remains, NESH, to request for the repatriation of Julia Pastrana to her native state for burial. His letter was accompanied by a letter by Barbata that included the moral, ethical and social justifications for Pastrana's return to Mexico for burial. NESH responded to the repatriation petition with a document recommending that Julia Pastrana be repatriated to México.

The University of Oslo and the Institute of Basic Medicine of the University of Oslo received NESH's recommendation, a formal petition from López Valdez's, as well as a letter from Barbata herself. The university accepted Julia Pastrana's repatriation to Mexico, but with the conditions that she never be exhibited again, that she be buried and not cremated, and that she be given funeral services following her Catholic faith.

On February 7, 2013, Barbata confirmed the identity of Pastrana's body in Oslo before the coffin was sealed. Ms. Barbata and a University of Oxford forensic anthropologist, Nicholas Márquez-Grant, noticed that Pastrana's feet still had bolts and metal rods that were used for exhibiting her body. The bolts were removed and placed at the foot of her coffin. Pastrana's coffin was transported by plane from Oslo to Culiacán where she was welcomed with a military arrival. The following day, on February 12, the coffin of Julia Pastrana was transported from Culiacán to Sinaloa de Leyva. She was welcomed with official ceremonies and a funeral mass, then taken to the Municipal Cemetery following local traditions. Julia Pastrana's coffin was covered in flowers and buried. Pastrana was dressed in an indigenous huipil made by Francisca Palafox, a master weaver from Oaxaca and placed in her coffin with a photograph of her child on her chest. Her tomb was covered in concrete and enclosed in walls that measure more than 1 meter in thickness to ensure that her tomb will never be vandalized and to guarantee that she will never be exposed again. The tomb was then covered with thousands of flowers that had arrived from all over the world.

Barbata's book The Eye of the Beholder: Julia Pastrana’s Long Journey Home brings together contributors from a wide variety of fields to explore Pastrana's story. Barbata has explored Pastrana's story through a variety of other mediums, such as through performance work, photography, and stop motion animation.

== Selected exhibitions ==
=== Solo exhibitions/performances ===
- Intervention: Indigo. Museo Textil de Oaxaca, Oaxaca, México. (2018)
- Intervention: Ocean Blues. Performance in collaboration with the Brooklyn Jumbies. Isabella Stewart Gardner Museum, Boston; DUMBO, Brooklyn, New York. Commissioned by Isabella Stewart Gardner Museum, Boston and supported by No Longer Empty in Brooklyn, NY. (2018)
- Original Is Never Finished. Adidas film Shoot. New York. In collaboration with the Brooklyn Jumbies. Director: Monty Marsh. (2018)
- The Eye of the Beholder. A Performance Work in Progress. Amphibian Stage Productions New Plays Development Residency, Fort Worth, Texas. Director: Tamilla Woodard, Digital Design: Katherine Freer (2018)
- Tiempo Local: arte y activismos para una memoria fronteriza. Laura Anderson Barbata: La extraordinaria historia de Julia Pastrana, Centro Cultural España. Santiago de Chile (2018)
- Ocean Calling. Performance in collaboration with Chris Walker, the Brooklyn Jumbies and Jarana Beat. United Nations Plaza, New York. Commissioned by TBA21 Academy, Vienna (2017)
- Intervention: Raphael Red. Performance in collaboration with the Brooklyn Jumbies. Isabella Stewart Gardner Museum, Boston (2017)
- Ocean Blue(s). Performance in Collaboration with the Brooklyn Jumbies. NTU Centre for Contemporary Art Singapore (2017)
- La Extraordinaria Historia de Julia Pastrana. Performance Work-in-progress, in collaboration with Fem Appeal. Columbia College Chicago; Rutgers University, NJ (2017)
- What-Lives-Beneath, TBA21 The Current Convening (performance in collaboration with Amina Blackwood-Meeks, Chris Walker, the Brooklyn Jumbies and the National Dance Company of Jamaica), Kingston, Jamaica (2016-12)
- Laura Anderson Barbata: Collaborations Beyond Borders (exhibition), Mary H. Dana Women Artists Series Galleries, Rutgers University, New Brunswick, NJ (2016)
- Transcommunality: Laura Anderson Barbata, Collaboration Beyond Borders, Cornell Fine Arts Museum, Orlando, Florida (2016)
- Helen Louise Textile Collection Gallery, University of Wisconsin, Madison (2016)
- BRIC Art House, Brooklyn, New York (2016)
- Centro de las Artes, Monterrey, NL (2016)
- Museo de la Ciudad de México (2016)
- Museo Textil de Oaxaca, Mexico (2016)
- Intervention: Indigo (public street performance in collaboration with Chris Walker, the Brooklyn Jumbies and Jarana Beat), Brooklyn, New York (2015)
- Harlem Art Factory Festival (public street performance in collaboration with the Brooklyn Jumbies), Harlem, New York La Repatriación de Julia Pastrana (exhibition), Festival Internacional Cervantino, Museo Iconográfico del Quijote, Guanajuato (2013)
- A Flower for Julia (international call to send a flower to be placed on Julia's grave the day of her burial in Mexico), Sinaloa de Leyva, México (2012)
- Intervention: Wall Street (public street performance in collaboration with the Brooklyn Jumbies), Financial District, New York Zancudos, Zanqueros en Zaachila (public street performance in collaboration with the Brooklyn Jumbies and los Zancudos de Zaachila), Oaxaca, México (2011)
- Among Tender Roots (exhibition), Columbia College Chicago Center for Book and Paper Arts, IL (2010)
- Jumbies Fort Worth! (performance and outreach program in collaboration with the Brooklyn Jumbies and Amphibian Stage Productions), Fort Worth, TX (2009)
- Jumbies! (performance and outreach program in collaboration with the Brooklyn Jumbies and Amphibian Stage Productions), The Modern Art Museum of Fort Worth, TX (2008)

=== Selected group exhibitions ===
- Day of the Dead (concert in collaboration with Apparatjik, Concha Buika and Void), Bergen International Music Festival, Norway Ejercicios exploratorios II: Creadoras contemporáneas en la colección MACG, Museo Alvar y Carrillo Gil, México City (2016)
- The Quixotic Days and Errant Nights of the Knight Errant Don Quijote (character design), Amphibian Stage Production, Fort Worth, TX. (
- Caribbean: Crossroads of the World, Perez Art Museum, Miami, FL; El Museo del Barrio, New York, NY; Queens Museum of Art, Queens, NY; Studio Museum Harlem, New York, NY. (2015)
- Social Paper: Hand Papermaking in the Context of Socially Engaged Art, Center for Book and Paper Arts, Columbia College Chicago, IL FOCO14, Festival de las Artes ARC, Coquimbo, Chile 59 (2015)
- X Bienal Monterrey, FEMSA, Museo de Arte Contemporaneo Monterrey, México Invitational: Twenty Jurors, Woman Made Gallery, Chicago, Il Second Generation, Columbia College Chicago, Chicago, Il (2012)
- Mujeres detrás de la lente: 100 años de creación fotográfica en México, CECUT, Tijuana, México (2011)
- AIO: Art in the Open Philadelphia, Schuylkill Banks Park, Philadelphia, PA Ciudadanas (collaboration with the Museo de Mujeres Artistas Mexicanas), Museo Universitario del Chopo, Mexico City (2010)
- Hecho en casa: Una aproximación a las prácticas objetuales en el arte mexicano contemporáneo, Museo de Arte Moderno. México City The Muhheakantuk in Focus, Wave Hill, Bronx, NY The Art of Personal Adornment, Inez and Milton Shaver Gallery, The Dahl Arts Center, Rapid City, SD (2009)
- Cardinal Points (Puntos Cardinales): A Survey of Contemporary Latino and Latin American Art from the Sprint Nextel Art Collection, Itinerant exhibition, USA (2007-2009)

== Selected awards, grants, and honors ==
- Miembro del Sistema Nacional para Creadores, Fondo Nacional para la Cultura y las Artes, CONACULTA, México (2015–18)
- Artist in Residence, Isabella Stewart Gardner Museum, Boston, MA (2016)
- Women in the Arts Award, Celebrating the Genius of Women, Orlando, FL (2016)
- The Current Fellow, Thyssen-Bornemisza Contemporary Art, Vienna, Austria (2015)
- Honorary Fellow, Latin American, Caribbean and Iberian Studies (LACIS), University of Wisconsin, Madison (2015)
- Arts Institute Interdisciplinary Artist in Residence, University of Wisconsin, Madison (2015)
- Segundo Concurso de Fotografía Contemporánea de México, Photography Award, Fundación Mexicana de Cine y Artes, A.C., México (2013)
- Selection Committee, Visual Arts Grants, Sistema Nacional de Creadores de Arte, FONCA-CONACULTA, México (2013)
- Advisory Board, Museos Vivos, México (2013)
- Residency, Interdisciplinary Arts Department and Columbia College Chicago Center for Book and Paper, IL (2012)
- Advisory Council, Artistic Dreams International, New York, NY (2011)
- Miembro del Sistema Nacional para Creadores, Fondo Nacional para la Cultura y las Artes, CONACULTA, MX (2010–13)
- Robin Fund Residency, Center for Book & Paper / Interdisciplinary Arts Dept., Columbia College, Chicago, IL (2010)
