= John F. Douthitt =

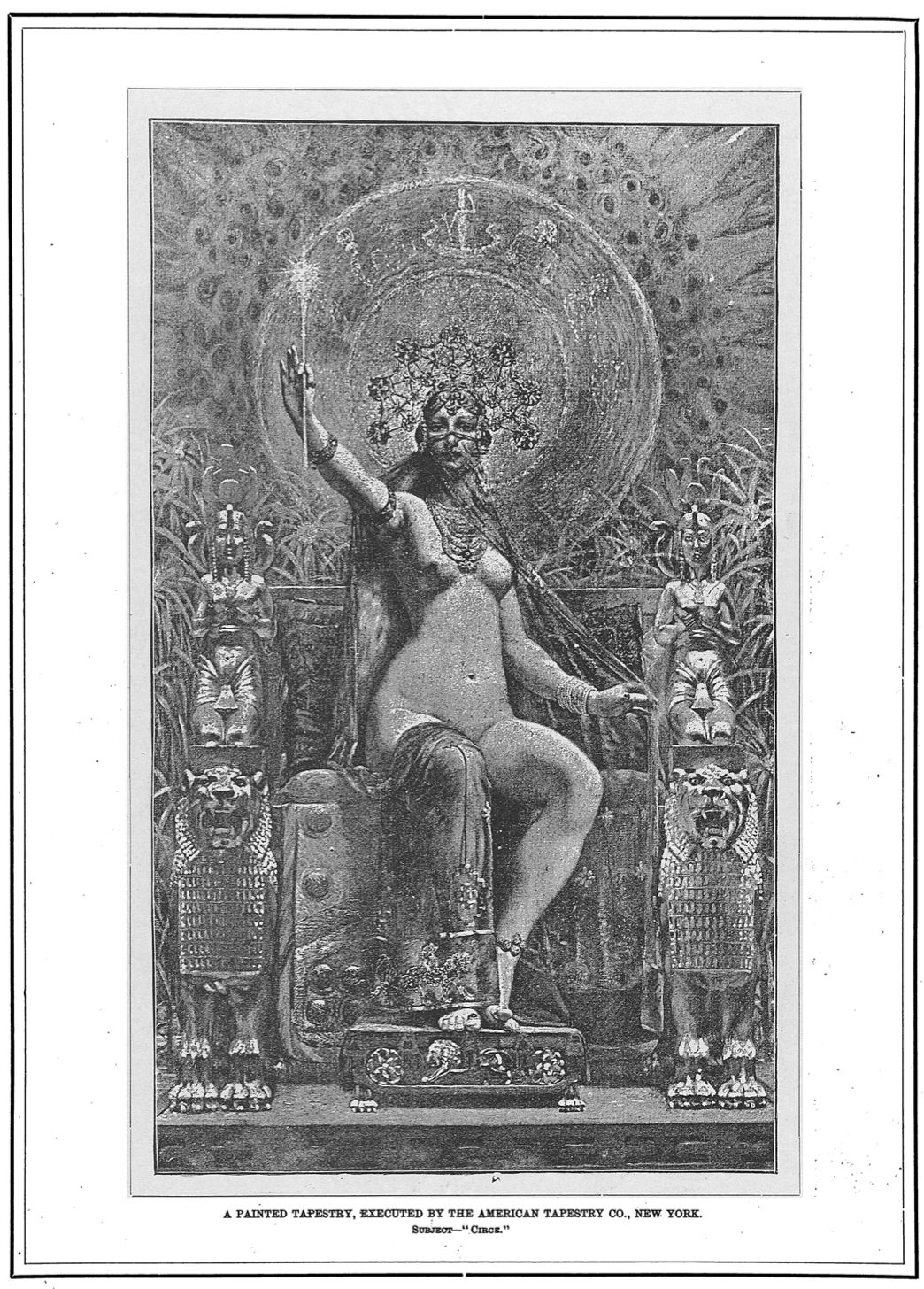
- A reproduction of Circe (1890), a design for the American Tapestry Company
- Born: January 22, 1856; Alton, Illinois
- Disappeared: 1908
- Occupation(s): artist, decorator, publisher
- Years active: 1880–1908
- Known for: painted tapestry
- Board member of: John F. Douthitt Company, American School of Art and Tapestry Company, Douthitt Gallery

John Franklin Douthitt (active 1880–1908) was an American artist, decorator, art dealer and publisher, founder of the John F. Douthitt Company, the American School of Art and Tapestry Company, and the Douthitt Gallery, all in New York City.

== Career ==
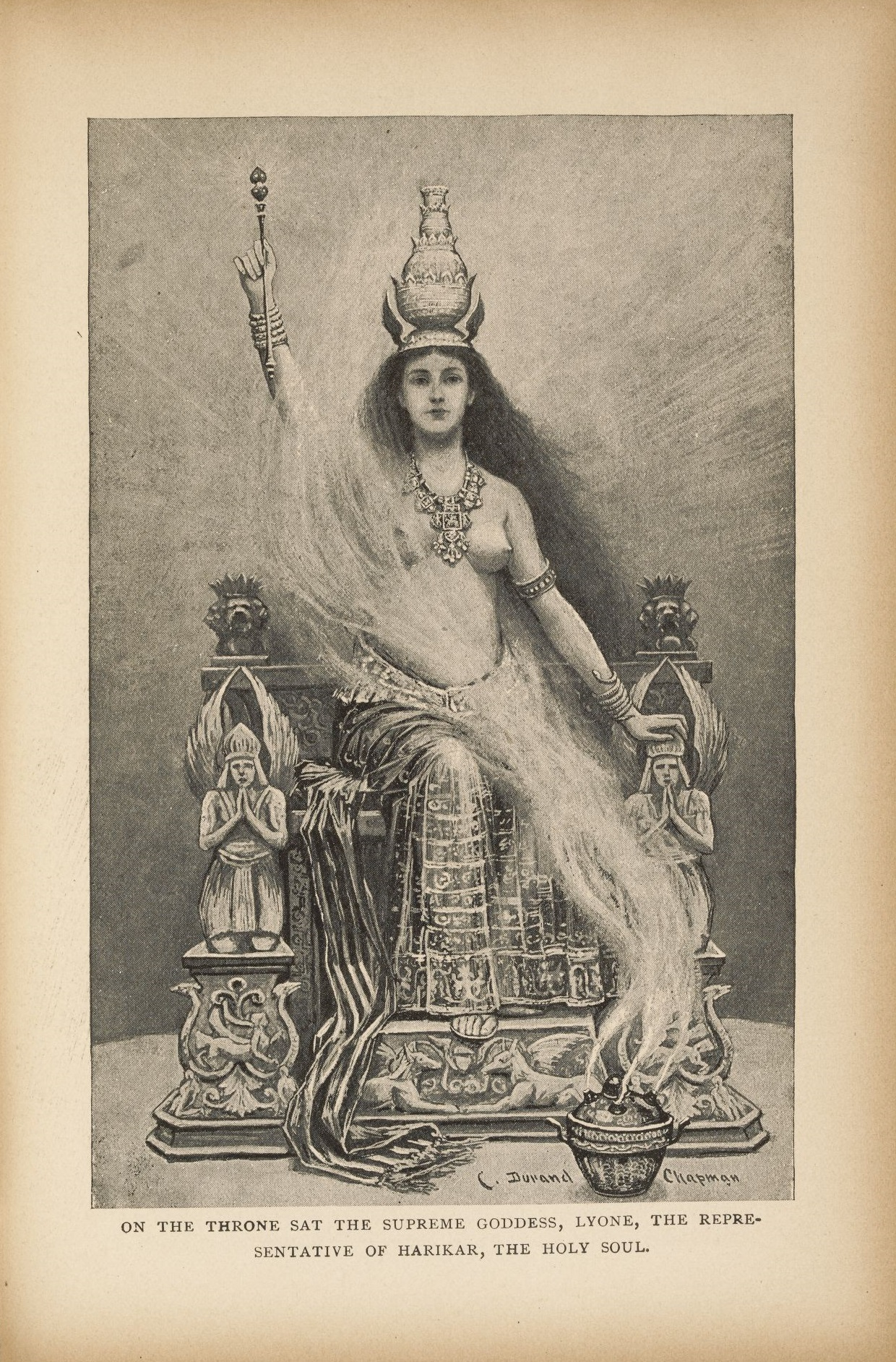
An illustration from Goddess of Atvatabar (1892), published by J. F. Douthitt

Douthitt was born in Alton, Illinois on 22 January 1856 and was orphaned at an early age. He went into business in 1880 as the manager of the Sauahbrah Oriental Entertainments, a Burmese act with which he toured the world. It was during this tour that he became interested in art and design.

On returning to the United States he set up in the art and decorating business. Although specialising in painted tapestry, he provided all kinds of decorating and interior design services to wealthy families in New York. The tapestry school attached to his workshop was run by Mrs A. L. Blanchard.

The Douthitt tapestry showroom at 286 Fifth Avenue was once one of the attractions for art lovers visiting New York. Work was collaborative, as described by a visitor in 1891: "he employs one to paint the heads of cupids, or figures, another to paint the bodies, another to paint the drapery, and still another to paint the backgrounds, or cloud effects, and in this way, by combining the best work of a number of artists, he can produce works of art that are unapproachable in their perfection".

In 1891 Douthitt was commissioned to furnish the mansion of Edward Lawrence Keyes, whose wife Sarah was a noted New York hostess, at 930 Fifth Avenue.

Douthitt was also active as a publisher, in 1892 bringing out William Richard Bradshaw's science fiction novel The Goddess of Atvatabar with illustrations by Cyrus Durand Chapman, and in 1896 his own Manual of Art Decoration (second edition 1902). In May 1894 he was publicizing the claims of the cyclist Thomas Stevens to have found a genuine "wonder-working Yogi" in India with whom he would soon be touring the United States.

In August 1894 Douthitt was profiled in the "Art Trades Supplement" to The Decorator and Furnisher as "one of the best known decorators in the United States".

The John F. Douthitt Company went into receivership in 1908, after losing $50,000 in the Gilsey House, a luxury hotel that eventually closed in 1911 after lengthy legal disputes concerning the lease.

In an apparent attempt to recover his fortune, Douthitt became involved in a scheme of J. P. Persch to sell bonds in an Independent Brewing Company that turned out to be fraudulent.
