= Julia Pastrana =

Mexican side show performer (1834–1860)

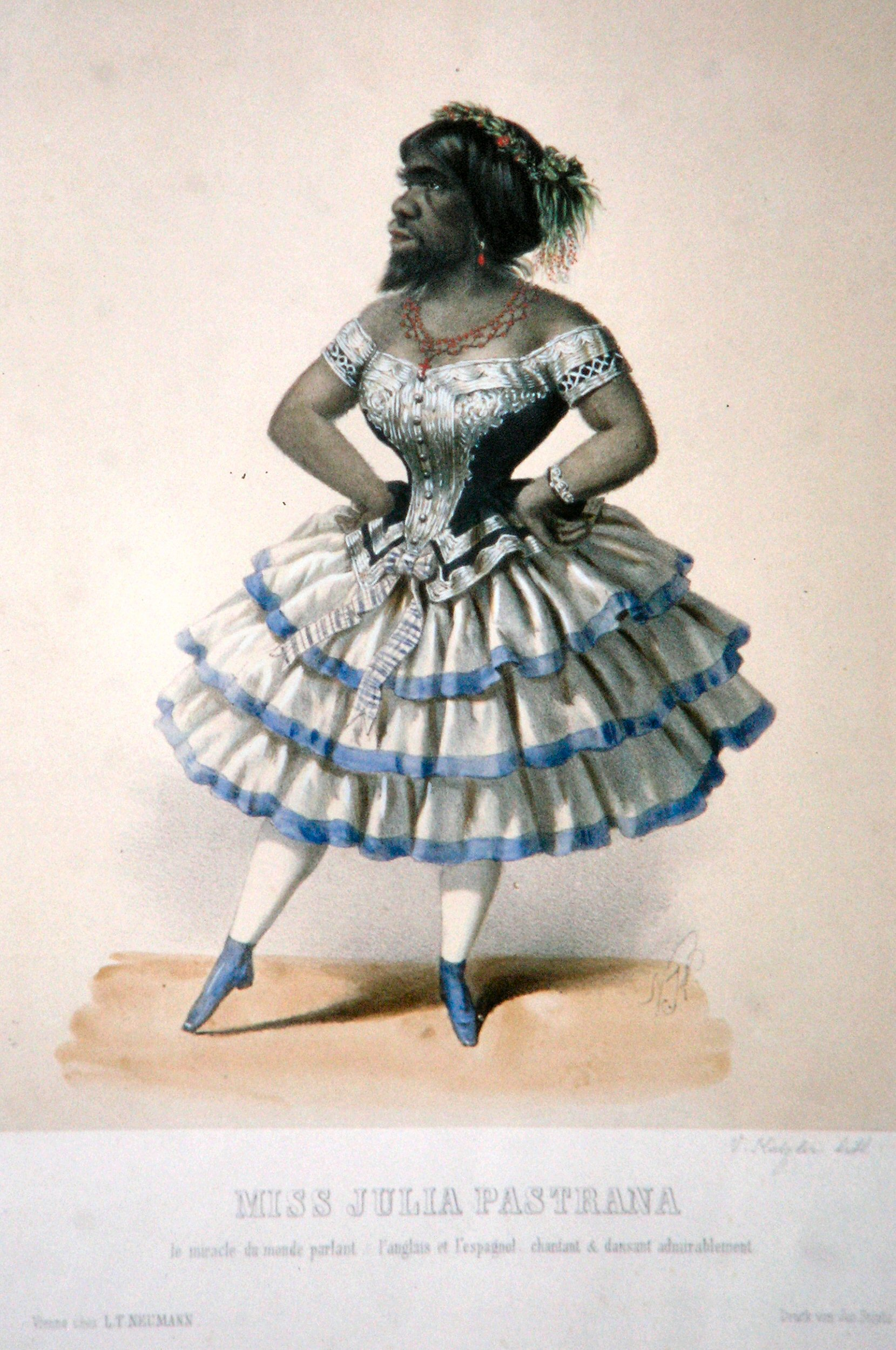
- Lithograph of Julia Pastrana by V. Katzler circa 1860
- Born: August 1834; Sinaloa, Mexico
- Died: 25 March 1860 (age 25); Moscow, Russian Empire
- Other names: Bear Woman, The Apewoman, The Nondescript
- Height: 4 ft 5 in (1.35 m)
- Spouse: Theodore Lent (m. 1855)
- Children: 1

Julia Pastrana (August 1834 – 25 March 1860) was a Mexican singer and exhibition performer who became one of the best-known sideshow performers of the 19th century. Born in Sinaloa, she had generalized hypertrichosis and gingival hyperplasia, conditions that affected her appearance and led to her being exhibited under promotional names including "The Nondescript", "Bear Woman", and "Ape Woman".

Although frequently advertised as a curiosity, Pastrana was an accomplished professional entertainer whose performances combined singing, dancing, conversation, and public appearances. She toured extensively throughout North America and Europe, where contemporary audiences often remarked on her intelligence, poise, and musical ability.

During her lifetime, Pastrana attracted sustained attention from physicians, naturalists, and anthropologists, who debated the causes of her appearance and advanced competing theories about her origins. Her case was later discussed by Charles Darwin in The Variation of Animals and Plants Under Domestication (1868).

Pastrana died in Moscow, Russian Empire, in 1860 following complications of childbirth. After her death, the preserved bodies of Pastrana and her infant son were exhibited for more than a century in museums, circuses, and amusement venues before her remains were repatriated to Mexico and buried near her birthplace in 2013.

== Early life ==
Little is known with certainty about Julia Pastrana's childhood in 1830s Sinaloa, and much of what has been written about her early life originated in promotional material produced by the showmen who later exhibited her.

One widely circulated account claimed that Pastrana belonged to a group described as the "Root Diggers", an Indigenous people portrayed as ape-like cave dwellers. According to this version, a woman identified only as Mrs. Espinosa was abducted by the group, later escaped with the young Pastrana, and brought her into Mexican society. The account originated in promotional literature produced for Pastrana's exhibitions and has been treated cautiously by later writers.

A second account, based on oral histories collected from Indigenous residents of Ocoroni, in the Mexican state of Sinaloa, describes Pastrana as a local girl known as the "wolf woman". According to this tradition, she lived with her mother until her mother's death, after which an uncle sold her into exhibition.

Despite their differences, both accounts state that Pastrana later lived in the household of Pedro Sánchez, the governor of Sinaloa, before leaving the governor's home in 1854, at about 20 years of age, to begin the career that brought her to the United States.

== Career ==
In 1854, at about 20 years of age, Pastrana left Sinaloa and began appearing in exhibitions in the United States. According to Mexican writer Ireneo Paz, she was brought to the country by Francisco Sepúlveda, a customs official in Mazatlán. She initially performed under the management of J. W. Beach, an American showman, and appeared in cities including New York, Boston, and Baltimore.

Although often advertised as a curiosity, Pastrana was also a professional entertainer. Her performances included singing, dancing, conversing with audiences, and appearing at public receptions and social gatherings. Contemporary observers frequently remarked on her intelligence, poise, and musical ability.

In July 1857, she made her debut in London as the "Wonder of the World". Over the next several years, she continued performing across Europe and became one of the best-known exhibition performers of her era. She appeared before audiences that ranged from working-class spectators to aristocrats and members of royal households.

After nearly six years on tour in North America and Europe, Pastrana's travels eventually brought her to Moscow, in the Russian Empire, where she continued performing until shortly before her death in March 1860.

== Scientific study and interpretation ==
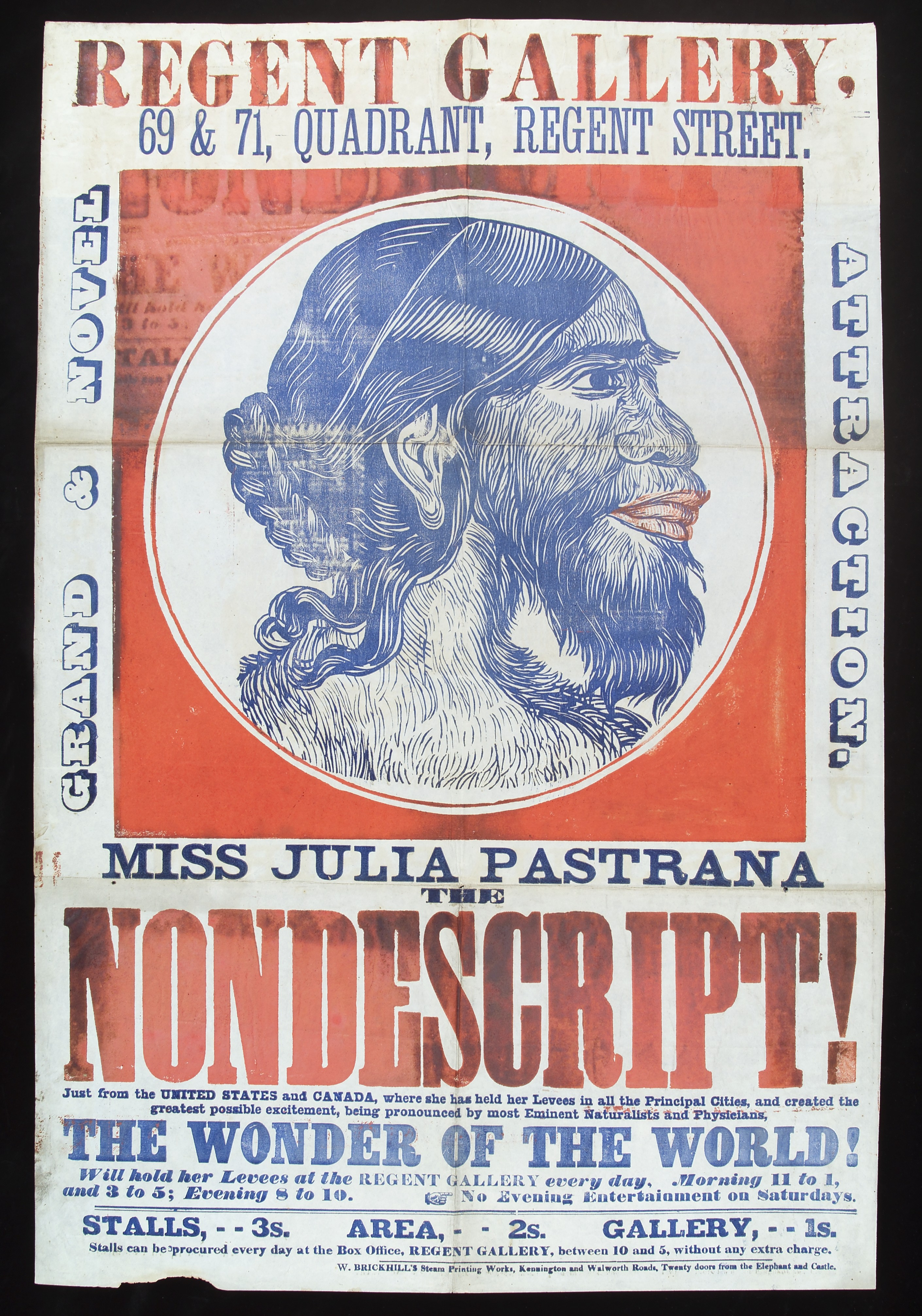
Julia Pastrana, "the nondescript", advertised for an exhibition of the famous bearded Lady.

Pastrana had a rare combination of medical conditions now identified as generalized hypertrichosis, which causes extensive hair growth over the face and body, and gingival hyperplasia, which enlarged her gums and affected the appearance of her lips, mouth, and teeth.

Throughout her career, Pastrana attracted the attention of doctors, scientists, and naturalists, who examined her and published competing interpretations of her appearance. Her managers also used these examinations to promote her exhibitions. She was advertised under names such as "The Nondescript", "Misnomer", "Bear Woman", "Baboon Lady", "Ape Woman", "Hybrid Indian", "Extraordinary Lady", and "The Ugliest Woman in the World".

Some observers argued that Pastrana represented a distinct species or a human-animal hybrid. Physician Alexander B. Mott claimed that she was the result of a union between a human and an orangutan, while S. Brainerd of Cleveland described her as belonging to a distinct species. Others rejected these claims. Naturalist Francis Trevelyan Buckland described her as a "deformed Mexican Indian woman", and comparative anatomist Samuel Kneeland of the Boston Society of Natural History concluded that she was human and of Indigenous Mexican ancestry.

Contemporary descriptions often portrayed Pastrana as both intelligent and animal-like. After seeing her exhibited in New York City in 1854, theatre chronicler George C. D. Odell wrote that her eyes "beam with intelligence", while also describing her in animalistic terms.

Pastrana's case continued to attract scientific interest after her death. In The Variation of Animals and Plants Under Domestication (1868), Charles Darwin described her as "a remarkably fine woman" with a "thick masculine beard and a hairy forehead". He noted that her preserved skin had been exhibited publicly and discussed her unusual dentition, writing that she had "an irregular double set of teeth, one row being placed within the other". Darwin concluded that the redundancy of her teeth caused her mouth to project and gave her face "a gorilla-like appearance".

== Marriage and family ==
On 10 November 1855, at about 21 years of age, Pastrana married her manager, Theodore Lent, in Baltimore, Maryland. While performing in Moscow, Russian Empire, Pastrana became pregnant with the couple's only child. On 20 March 1860, she gave birth to a son, who inherited the same generalized hypertrichosis that characterized his mother's appearance. The infant survived for only three days. Pastrana died from complications from childbirth five days later.

== Exhibition after death ==
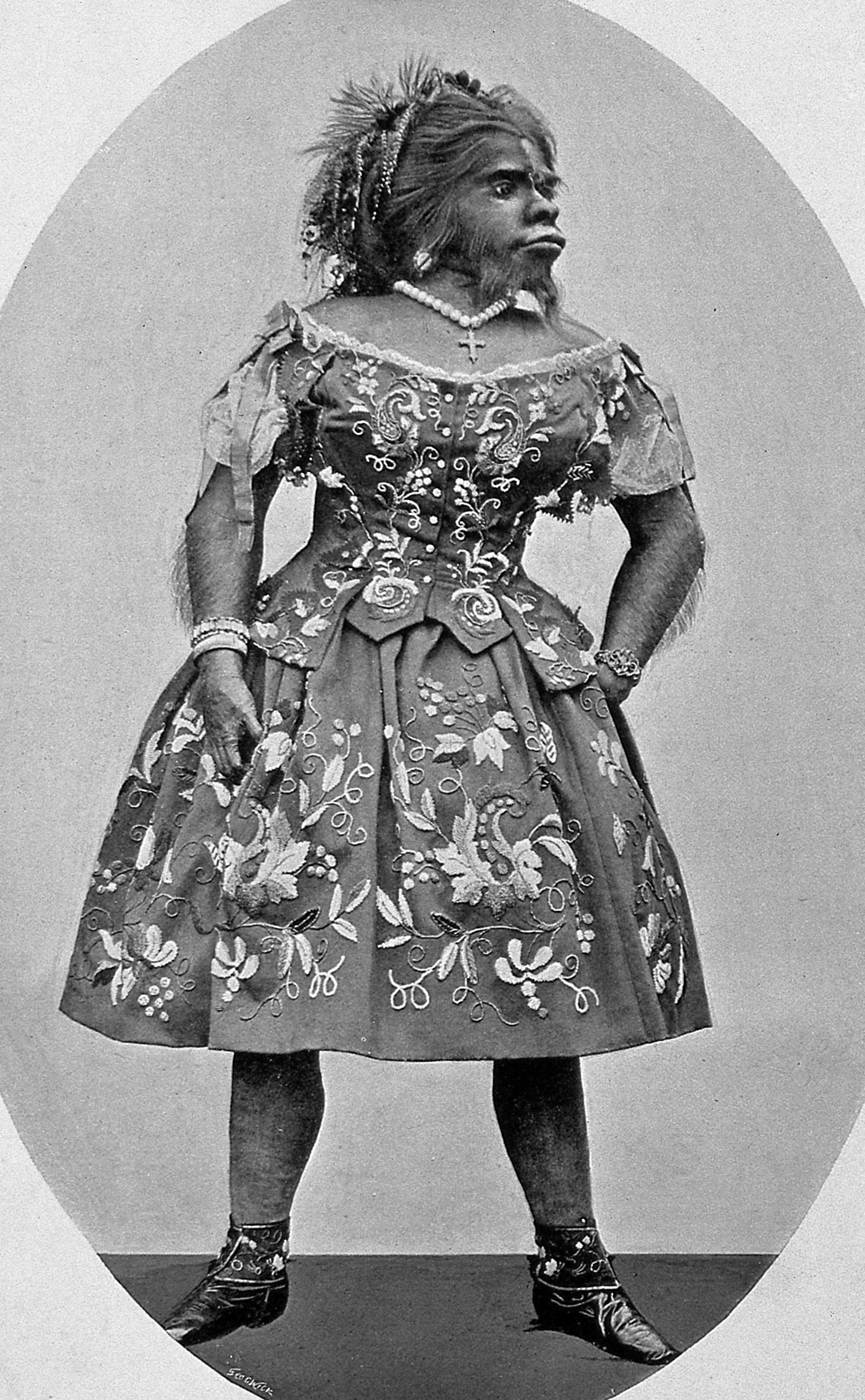
Julia Pastrana, image from a 1900 book, showing her preserved remains

Following the deaths of his wife and son on 25 March 1860, Lent sold her body and that of their son to Professor Sukolov of Moscow University who preserved them. The process was a blend of taxidermy techniques and embalming chemicals. Although generically referred to as a "mummy" by some authors, her preserved body was technically not a mummy because it was not mummified. Her body was "stuffed", as noted by renowned naturalist and taxidermist Charles Darwin.

After the bodies were preserved by Sukolov, Lent re-purchased them from him and began exhibiting them throughout Europe. Lent later found another woman with similar features, married her and changed her name from Marie Bartel to Zenora Pastrana, becoming wealthy from her exhibition.

For over a hundred years, the bodies of Pastrana and her son were displayed around the world in museums, circuses and amusement parks. They appeared in Norway in 1921 and toured the US as late as 1972. Later that year, a tour of Sweden drew considerable public opposition, leading to the bodies being withdrawn from public view. Vandals broke into the storage facility in August 1976 and damaged the baby's body. The remains were consumed by mice. Julia's preserved body was stolen in 1979, but stored at the Oslo Forensic Institute after the body was reported to police but not identified. It was identified in 1990 and for many years rested in a sealed coffin at the Department of Anatomy, Oslo University. In 1994, the Norwergian Parliament recommended burying her remains, but the Minister of Sciences decided to keep them, so scientists could perform research. A special permit was required to gain access to her remains.

== Repatriation ==
In 2012, Norwegian authorities agreed to return Pastrana's remains to Mexico. In February 2013, more than 150 years after her death, her remains were repatriated to Mexico with the assistance of Sinaloa governor Mario López Valdez, visual artist Laura Anderson Barbata, and Norwegian authorities.

Pastrana was buried in Sinaloa de Leyva, a town in the Mexican state of Sinaloa near her birthplace. Hundreds of people attended her Catholic funeral. After a funeral mass, her coffin was carried to the town cemetery while a band played traditional music.

Filmmaker Eva Aridjis filmed the burial for her documentary Chuy, The Wolf Man, which follows a modern Mexican family living with congenital hypertrichosis.

== In popular culture ==
The life of Pastrana inspired the 1964 Italian-French film The Ape Woman by Marco Ferreri. The film very loosely follows Theodore Lent's relationship with Pastrana, with the setting updated to then present-day Naples and Paris.

In the year 2000 a film based on Julia Pastrana was announced with Richard Gere cast as a circus manager. The project was eventually cancelled.

A musical, Pastrana, by Australian writers Allan McFadden and Peter Northwood, was performed by Melbourne's Church Theatre in 1989. The production was nominated for five Melbourne Green Room Awards.

A play based on Pastrana's life, The True History of the Tragic Life and Triumphant Death of Julia Pastrana, the Ugliest Woman in the World (1998), was written by Shaun Prendergast. A 2003 Texas production of the play, staged by Kathleen Anderson Culebro, sister of Laura Anderson Barbata, led to the campaign by Anderson Barbata to repatriate Pastrana's remains from Norway to Mexico.

In 2024, Disney produced an eight-episode TV series, La increíble historia de Julia Pastrana. The musical supergroup Apparatjik released a single titled "Julia" in March 2020, accompanied by a lyric video.

== See also ==
- Bearded lady
- Alice Elizabeth Doherty, "The Minnesota Woolly Girl"
- Annie Jones, "The Bearded Woman"
- Krao Farini, "The Missing Link"
- Ferriman-Gallwey score
- Negro of Banyoles, example of a taxidermied human
- Repatriation of human remains
- Sarah Baartman
- Human Zoo
