= Cyrus Durand Chapman =

American artist and architect

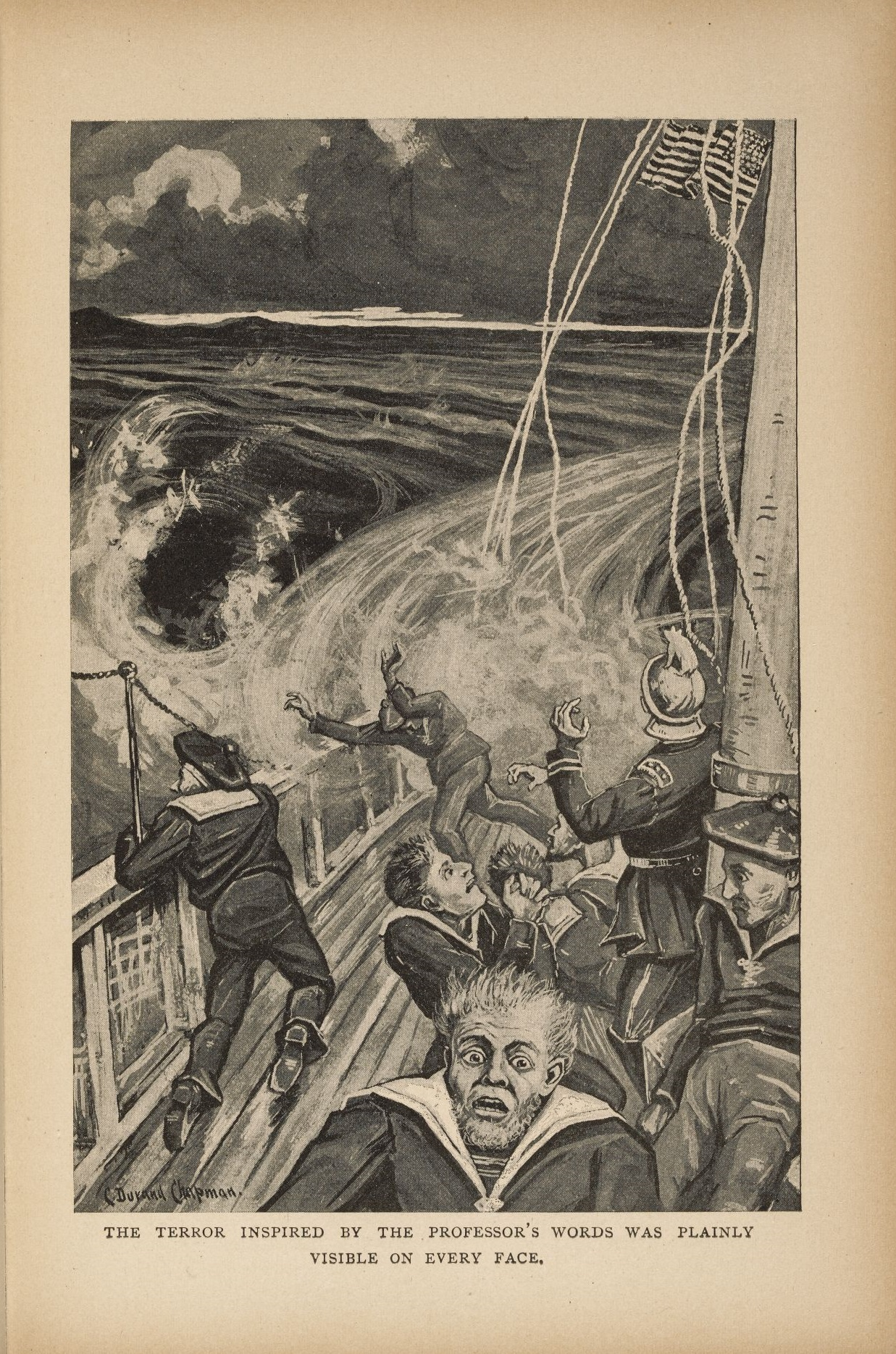
An illustration from The Goddess of Atvatabar (1892)

Cyrus Durand Chapman (1856–1918) was an American artist and architect. Born in Irvington, New Jersey, Chapman achieved fame with his painting The Wedding Bonnet (ca. 1877) now in Newark Museum. In 1885 he set up a studio in Newark, New Jersey. Chapman was the illustrator of William Richard Bradshaw's science fiction novel The Goddess of Atvatabar, published by J. F. Douthitt in 1892. He was interred at Clinton Cemetery in his birthplace.
