= Fort Taylor (Washington) =

Coordinates: 46°33′18″N 118°10′26″W

Fort Taylor was a temporary Army post during 1858 in Washington Territory, on a site in present-day Columbia County, eastern Washington.

The fort was located on the south bank of the Snake River, at its confluence with the tributary Tucannon River. Its now-submerged site is approximately 2 miles (3.2 km) northwest of the town of Starbuck, and east of State Highway 261.

== History ==
Fort Taylor was established in early August 1858 by Captain E. D. Keyes with a detachment of dragoons, during the Spokane – Coeur d'Alene – Paloos War. It was built to protect the Snake River crossing for the U.S. Army at the mouth of Tucannon River.

The structure's walls were built of basalt rock gabions, with a hexagonal wood blockhouse rising above. It had a large flatboat to ferry people and supplies across the river.

This fort was only used for 6 weeks in 1858 by Colonel George Wright as his Snake River crossing point for his forces on 18 August 1858. After a few days he finished crossing for his campaign against the allied tribes to the north that ended with the Battle of Four Lakes and Battle of Spokane Plains.

Fort Taylor was named for Captain Oliver Hazard Perry Taylor who was killed on 17 May 1858, while he served with Lt. Colonel Edward Steptoe in the Battle of Pine Creek against the allied tribes of Spokanes, Coeur d'Alenes, Palouse, Cayuse, and Yakimas.

Demises

On 1 October 1858 Fort Taylor was abandoned. With the end of the Yakima War no further need of troops were required at the crossing.

The site of Fort Taylor was submerged in 1968, with the filling of the new Lake Herbert G. West reservoir behind Lower Monumental Dam on the Snake River.

== See also ==
- Marmes Rockshelter — also submerged under reservoir.
- Snake River topics
