= William R. Bradshaw =

American novelist (1851-1927)

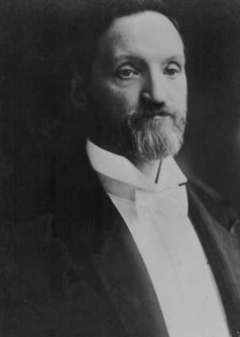
- Born: 14 January 1851; County Down
- Died: July 19, 1927 (aged 75–76); Flushing, Queens
- Occupations: Author; editor; lecturer; activist
- Writing career
- Genre: Science fiction
- Notable work: The Goddess of Atvatabar

William Richard Bradshaw (14 January 1851 – 19 July 1927) was an Irish-born American author, editor, lecturer and anti-vivisection activist. He is known best for his science fiction-type novel The Goddess of Atvatabar.

== Life ==
Bradshaw was born in County Down on 14 January 1851 and moved to the United States in 1883. He was the magazine editor of Field & Stream, Literary Life and Decorator and Furnisher. He was an active proponent of anti-vivisectionism for many years and lectured for the New York Anti-Vivisection Society. He described a vivisectionist as a "torturer worse than those who perform horrors during the Middle Ages".

He was a resident of Flushing, Queens, New York from 1896 until his death (residing at 57 St. George's Place, Flushing, during December, 1913). A member of the Republican party, he served as a party district captain in Flushing. Bradshaw died after a brief illness at his home at 37 Locust Street, Flushing on July 19, 1927, aged 75. He was survived by his wife, two sons and three daughters.

== Literary career ==
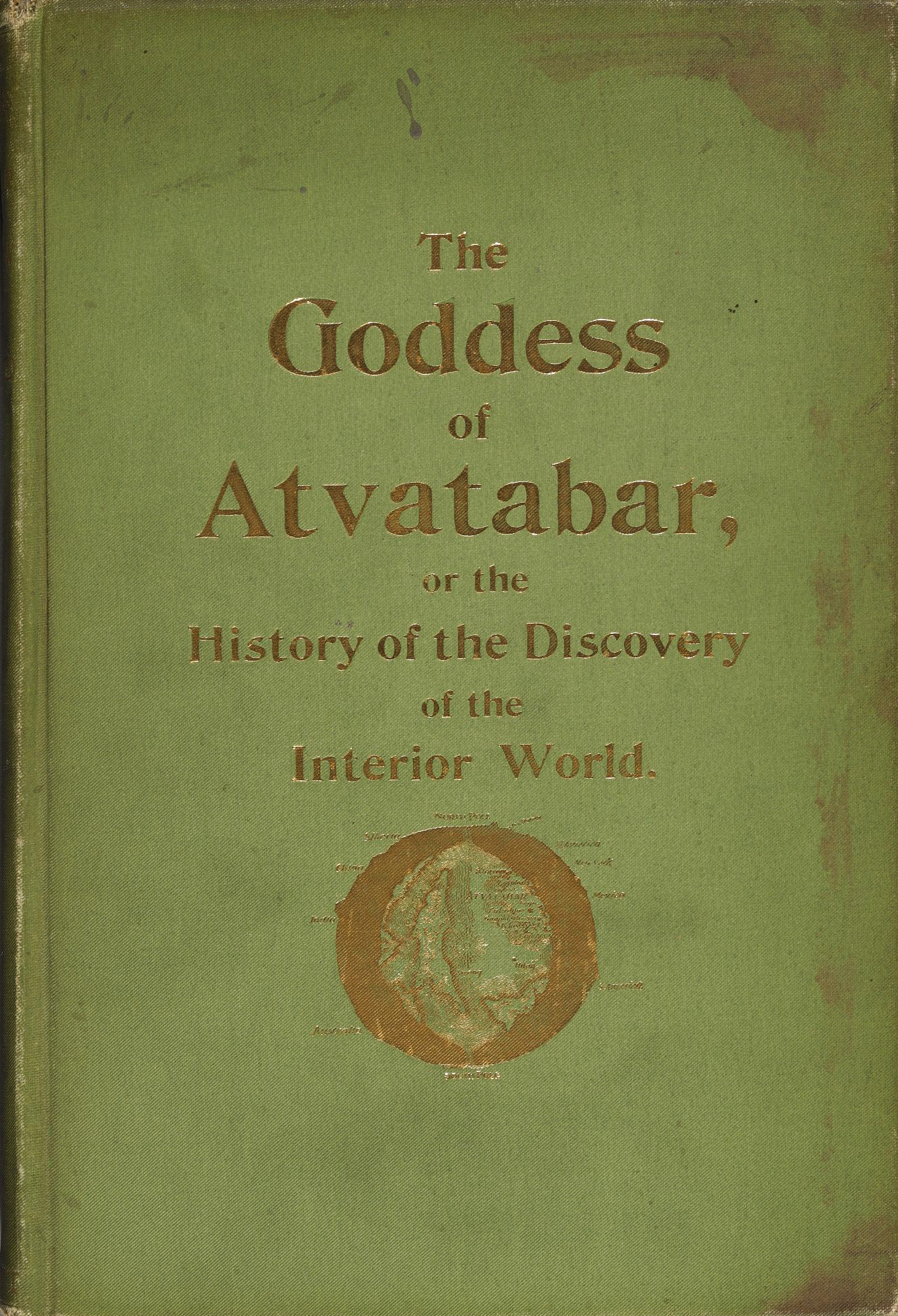
Cover of The Goddess of Atvatabar, 1892

Bradshaw contributed regularly to a number of magazines, and served as editor of two of them, Literary Life and later The Decorator and, from 1890 to 1896, Decorator and Furnisher. He was also associated with Field & Stream magazine. He wrote a number of books, most importantly on vivisection, but is remembered mainly for a work of fiction, The Goddess of Atvatabar: being the history of the discovery of the interior world, and conquest of Atvatabar, a Utopian hollow Earth novel using Symmesian geography from the ideas of John Cleves Symmes, Jr. Entering the interior of the world via a Symmes Hole, the protagonists from the world above find an advanced civilization who use spiritual power to do everything from maintain youth to resurrect the dead. In a civil war that erupts following the Atvatabar Goddess's love for a surface man, Lexington White, the ruling powers are overthrown and Lexington White becomes the new king of Atvatabar, the Goddess his queen, and rich trade relations with the surface are opened. It was published by J. F. Douthitt in 1892, and featured an introduction by Julian Hawthorne and illustrations by Cyrus Durand Chapman.

== Selected publications ==
- The Goddess of Atvatabar: being the history of the discovery of the interior world, and conquest of Atvatabar (1892)
- "The House. The Salon" (The Art Amateur, Oct.-Nov. 1898, Jan. 1899)
- "Carpets and Rugs" (The Art Amateur, Feb. 1899)
- "Hunting for Gold at Porcupine Lake" (Field and Stream, April 1910)
- Naturopathy the Medicine of the Future (with Benedict Lust) (1914)
