= The Decorator and Furnisher =

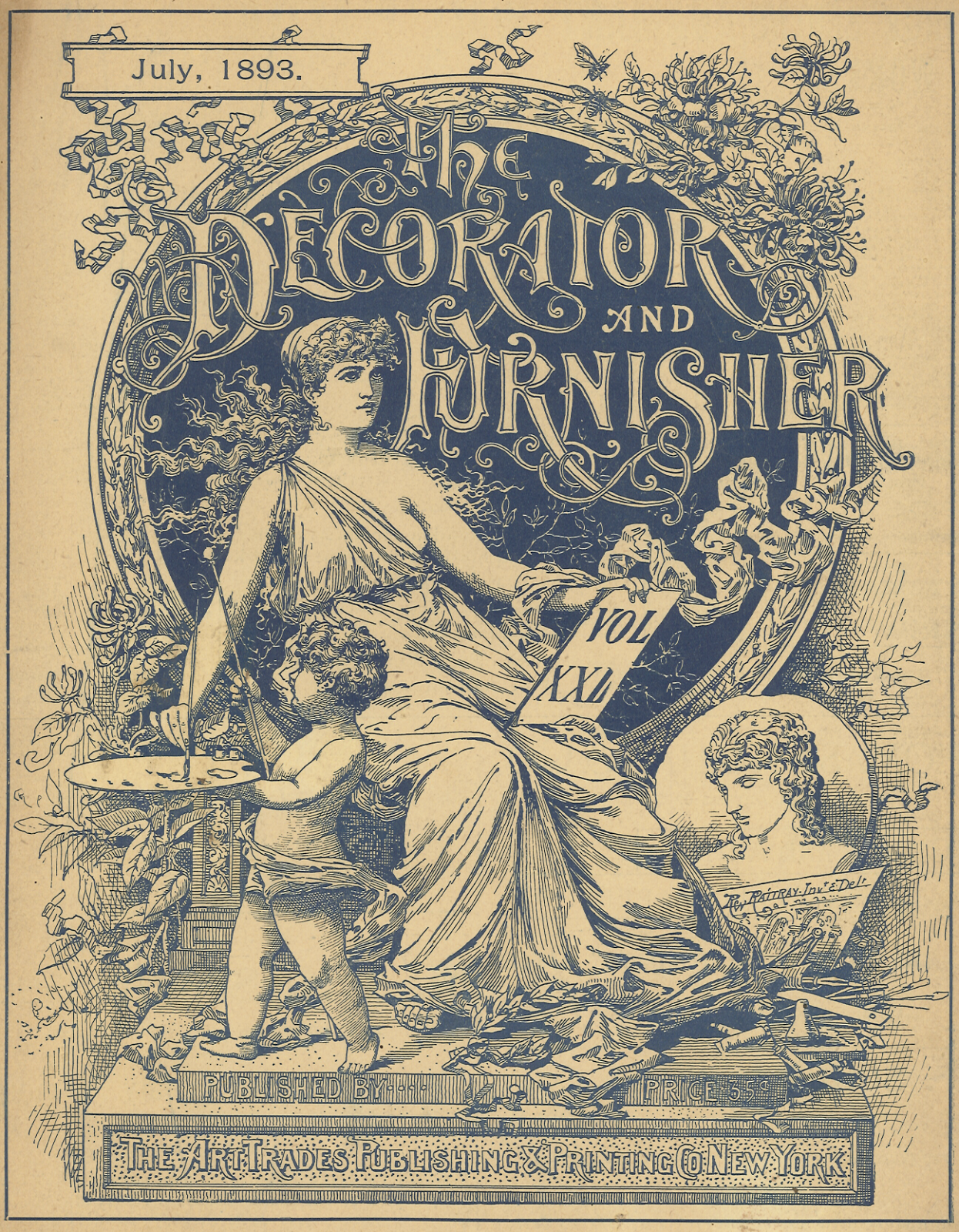
- Front cover, July 1893
- Format: Monthly
- ISSN: 2150-6256
- OCLC: 535471489

The Decorator and Furnisher, published in New York City from 1882 to 1897, was a monthly magazine dedicated to aspects of interior decoration. After ceasing publication it was briefly revived in 1898 under the title Home Decorator and Furnisher.

Initially edited by A. Curtis Bond, the editorship passed to T. A. Kennett in 1887, to William R. Bradshaw in 1890, and finally, in 1896, to Edward Dewson.

The Decorator and Furnisher was one of the journals that promoted Cincinnati wood carving.

Back issues have been made freely available through JSTOR by the Thomas J. Watson Library of the Metropolitan Museum of Art.
