= Thaddeus P. Mott =

American soldier and adventurer (1831–1894)

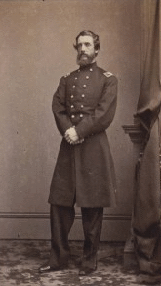
- Capt. Thaddeus P. Mott as commanding officer of the 14th Regiment New York Volunteer Cavalry, c. 1863.
- Born: December 7, 1831; New York City, New York, US
- Died: November 23, 1894 (aged 62); Toulon, France
- Occupation: Military officer
- Known for: Adventurer, world sailor and soldier of fortune; recruited Civil War veterans into Egyptian service and served as the first aide-de-camp to Khedive Isma'il Pasha.
- Spouse: Emily Josephine Daunton (m. 1858–1893)
- Children: Valentine Mott; Marie Louise Mott
- Parent(s): Valentine Mott and Louisa D. Munn

Thaddeus Phelps Mott (December 7, 1831 – November 23, 1894) was an American adventurer, sailor and soldier of fortune. A former Union Army officer during the American Civil War, he also took part in wars in Mexico, Italy, and the Ottoman Empire. He was primarily responsible for recruiting former Union and Confederate soldiers for service in the Egyptian Army, in which he held the rank of major general, and was the first officer to take service with the Khedive Isma'il Pasha as his aide-de-camp in 1870. At the time of his death, he was also the last surviving son of the eminent surgeon Valentine Mott.

== Biography ==
=== Early life and military career ===
Mott was born in New York City, New York, the son of Dr. Valentine Mott (1785–1865) and Louisa Dunmore Munn. He was one of nine children born to the couple. Little is known of his early life except that, as a child, he "developed a spirit of adventure". He was a natural linguist and was educated at New York University where his father was emeritus professor of surgery.

At age 17, he left the country to fight in revolutionary Italy, commissioned as a second lieutenant, serving under Giuseppe Garibaldi. Suffering from ill health following his Italian service, mostly due to exposure and privation, Mott subsequently served as a shipmate on various clippers during the next several years. He initially signed on to the Hornet bound for California, then as a third mate on the Hurricane in 1851, a second mate on the St. Denis in 1852 and the mate of the St. Nicholas in 1854. He returned to California a year later and spent 1856–1857 in the Mexican Army under General Ignacio Comonfort prior to and during the Reform War. In 1858, he married Emily Josephine Daunton and had two children with her, Marie Louise and Valentine Mott.

=== Return to the United States and the American Civil War ===
He eventually returned to the United States and enlisted in the Union Army shortly before the American Civil War where he was assigned as captain of artillery at the Chain Bridge fortification in Washington, D.C. He initially served as captain of the 3rd Independent Battery, New York Volunteer Artillery, which was active on the upper Potomac during the first year of the war. Mott and the 3rd New York Artillery saw action during the Seven Days Battles fought for five consecutive hours defeating each Confederate force put against them though sustaining heavy casualties. All the officers from the battery were promoted from the ranks. Mott resigned as battery commander to accept a commission to the 19th Infantry Regiment but briefly returned in September 1862 to lead the regiment at Lewinsville, Virginia in battle with the famed Washington Battery and forced them to retreat.

A year later, he was promoted to the rank of lieutenant colonel of cavalry, and then reassigned to the 14th Regiment New York Volunteer Cavalry. Mott was one of the organizers of the regiment which mustered in on Rikers Island as part of a volunteer brigade sponsored by the New York Metropolitan Police. He led the regiment during the New York City draft riots later that year. On the third day of the riots, in what would be the first major engagement of the day, Mott was dispatched along with units commanded by Captain John H. Howell and General Charles C. Dodge to confront rioters reportedly gathering at 32nd Street and Eighth Avenue. With orders to confront and disperse the mob, Mott led a troop of cavalry and a battery of howitzers supporting General Dodge and the 8th New York Volunteer Infantry Regiment. Upon reaching Eighth Avenue, the soldiers discovered three African Americans hanging to lamp posts "while a gang of ferocious women crowded about the dangling bodies, slashing them with knives as a mob of men estimated at more than five thousand yelled and cheered". The crowd fell back as the soldiers advanced and Mott charged forward on his horse to cut one of the men down from the lamp post. As he was doing so, a rioter attempted to drag Mott off his horse and Mott was forced to kill him with his cavalry sabre.

Almost immediately after returning to his command, Mott and his men were assaulted by bricks and stones hurled by the rioters, followed by "a brisk fire from muskets and pistols". The mob charged down the street. Believing they intended to capture the regiment's guns, Mott ordered Captain Howell to bring two howitzers into position in Seventh Avenue and prepare to sweep Thirty-Second Street with artillery fire. Mott led his men against the rioters; the cavalry and infantry units charged with sabre and bayonet and managed to drive the mob back to Eighth Avenue. The rioters returned, however, when the soldiers withdrew to protect the artillerymen. Howell shouted to the rioters to surrender. The crowd's jeers and taunts prompted Howell to give the order to fire. The howitzers, loaded with grape and canister shot, ripped through the tightly packed mob and inflicted heavy casualties. The crowd withstood six volleys before scattering and moving northward. The soldiers were broken up into small groups to clear the side streets and cut down the men hanging from the lamp posts before returning to their headquarters on Mulberry Street. A half-an-hour after the soldiers left, the rioters returned to carry away their dead and wounded, and "again strung up the Negros". The bodies would remain there until an NYPD squad under Captain Samuel Brower could safely remove them from the site. Afterwards, Mott was transferred to the Department of the Gulf where he was chief of outposts before finally resigning his commission in 1864.

=== Service to the Ottoman Empire ===
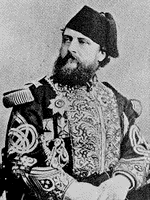
Mott as an Egyptian military officer.

Mott remained in the United States for several years after the war. While in New York, he was a member of both the Freemasons' Holland Lodge No. 8 and Jerusalem Chapter No. 8, R.A.M. In 1867, he was nominated to replace General Lawrence as U.S. Minister to Costa Rica but declined the offer. A year later, he travelled to Turkey to join the Ottoman Army and then on to Cairo where he was appointed a major general or "ferik-pacha". That same year, he was named Grand Officer of the Imperial Order of the Madjidieh by Sultan Abdulaziz. He also became a member of the "Conseal de Guerre" and saw plenty of service in the Balkans during the next few years.

In early 1869, Mott was contacted by the then Egyptian Khedive Isma'il Pasha to enlist his help in recruiting American officers to reorganize Egypt's military forces. Being subordinate to the Ottoman Empire, and thus without official diplomatic representation, Isma'il was not able to request assistance directly from the U.S. government and instead had to rely on independent agents. Mott was an ideal candidate given his mercenary background and family connections to the Ottomans. His father, Valentine Mott, had been personal physician to Sultan Abdulmejid I and one of his sisters was married to the Ottoman ambassador to the United States, Edouard Blak. Generals Charles Pomeroy Stone, Henry H. Sibley, and William W. Loring, all recommended by General William T. Sherman, accompanied Mott to Egypt later that year. Many of the men recruited by Mott had fought on one side or the other during the Civil War, were graduates from West Point and Annapolis Naval Academy and helped rebuild both the Egyptian army and navy. Mott and others also commanded troops in exploration missions not only to improve the overall Egyptian military establishment but also to increase knowledge of Egypt's geography.

In 1870, Mott was made the first aide-de-camp to the Isma'il Pasha. Two years later, he also became a Grand Officer of the Imperial Order of the Osmanieh. He remained in Egyptian service until his contract expired four years later. Declining to renew it, Mott instead turned over command to Charles Stone and returned to Turkey to take part in the wars between Serbia, Russia, and the Ottoman Empire. He later distinguished himself during the Battle of Shipka Pass.

=== Retirement and later years ===
In September 1876, he visited Paris to consult a French physician regarding a chronic ailment. He was forced to retire from military service for health reasons three years later. Prior to his retirement, he was awarded the war medal of the "Croissant Rouge" which, at the time, had been awarded to only 18 men including the Sultan himself. He settled in Toulon to work as an American consular agent and continued to live there with his family for over ten years until his death on November 23, 1894. He was the last surviving son of the Mott family. Mott's military career in Egypt, as well as those of other American officers, was featured in Real Soldiers of Fortune (1906) by Richard Harding Davis.
