= Andrew Bolon =

Andrew J. Bolon
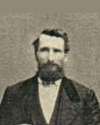
- Born: c. 1826; Pennsylvania
- Died: September 25, 1855 (aged 29); Klickitat County, Washington

Andrew Jackson Bolon (c. 1826 – September 25, 1855) was a Bureau of Indian Affairs agent whose 1855 death at the hands of renegade Yakama is considered one of several contributing factors in the outbreak of the Yakima War. Some sources assert Bolon was the first law enforcement officer killed in the line of duty in the territory that is now the state of Washington, though the Washington Peace Officers Memorial in Olympia, Washington lists a King County sheriff's deputy killed the year before Bolon's death.

== Early life ==
Bolon was born in Pennsylvania, where he married, eventually emigrating west and settling in Vancouver, Washington. During the Cayuse War Bolon served in the Oregon militia.

By May 1855 he was working as a Sub-Agent in the Bureau of Indian Affairs, reporting to Agent James Doty. Bolon had been assigned responsibility for the Yakima Reservation and spent the summer of 1855 meeting tribal leaders and learning the geography of the area. Bolon was well-liked by the Yakama and had forged a close friendship with Shumaway, Kamiakin's younger brother.

Andrew Jackson Bolon, Curtis Short, Henry C. Morse (left to right), c. 1850

== Death ==
=== Background ===
Treaties between the United States and several Indian tribes in the Washington Territory resulted in reluctant tribal recognition of U.S. sovereignty over a vast amount of land in the Washington Territory. The tribes, in return for this recognition, were to receive half of the fish in the territory in perpetuity, awards of money and provisions, and reserved lands where white settlement would be prohibited. While governor Isaac Stevens had guaranteed the inviolability of Native American territory following tribal accession to the treaties, he lacked the legal authority to enforce it pending ratification of the agreements by the United States Senate. Meanwhile, the widely publicized discovery of gold in Yakama territory prompted an influx of unruly prospectors who traveled, unchecked, across the newly defined tribal lands, to the growing consternation of Indian leaders. In 1855 two of these prospectors were killed by Qualchin, the nephew of Kamiakin, after it was discovered they had raped a Yakama woman.

=== The murder ===
Some confusion exists surrounding the death of Bolon. According to the most popular version of events, Bolon, receiving word of the prospector deaths, departed for the scene on horseback to investigate but was intercepted by Shumaway who warned him Qualchin was too dangerous to confront. Heeding Shumaway's warning, Bolon turned back and began the ride home. En route he came upon a group of Yakama traveling south and decided to ride along with them. One of the members of this group was Mosheel, Shumaway's son. Mosheel decided to kill Bolon for reasons that are not entirely clear. Though a number of Yakama in the traveling party protested, their objections were overruled by Mosheel who invoked his regal status. Discussions about Bolon's fate took place over much of the day (Bolon, who did not understand Sahaptian, was unaware of the conspiracy unfolding among his traveling companions). During a rest stop, as Bolon and the Yakama were eating lunch, Mosheel and at least three other Yakama set upon him with knives. Bolon yelled out in Chinook Jargon, "I did not come to fight you!" before being stabbed in the throat. Bolon's horse was then shot, and his body and personal effects burned. These details of Bolon's death were told to rancher Lucullus McWhorter sometime between 1911 and 1915 by the elderly Suleil, who claimed to have been witness to the event as a young man.

A different version of events has Bolon murdered by Qualchin himself after threatening reprisals for the killing of the prospectors. This version of the story was more popular prior to the recording of Suleil's narrative by McWhorter. When Qualchin, toward the end of the Yakima War, was captured and hanged by Col. George Wright, it was under the assumption that he was the murderer of Bolon.

=== Aftermath ===
When Shumaway heard of Bolon's death he immediately sent an ambassador to inform the U.S. Army garrison at Fort Dalles, before calling for the arrest of his son, Mosheel, who he said should be turned over to the territorial government to forestall the American retaliation he felt would likely occur. A Yakama council overruled Shumaway, however, and began preparing for war. After receiving Shumaway's ambassador, U.S. Army district commander Gabriel Rains ordered Major Granville O. Haller to set out with an expeditionary column from Fort Dalles. Haller's force was met and turned back at the edge of Yakama territory by a large group of Yakama warriors. As Haller withdrew, his company was engaged and routed by the Yakama.

News of the death of Bolon and the defeat of Haller's company sparked panic throughout the territory and fear that an Indian uprising was in progress. Rains appealed to the governments of Washington and Oregon for military aid. In response, two companies of Washington militia were mobilized to reinforce the 350 federal troops already under Rains' command, while Oregon Governor George Law Curry activated a cavalry regiment of 800 men, three companies of which crossed the Columbia River and into Washington territory in early November. The Yakima War had begun.

After the end of hostilities, two of Mosheel's confederates in the murder of Bolon were arrested at Priest Rapids by a detachment of United States Army Indian Scouts who returned them to Fort Simcoe where they were hanged. Mosheel himself was captured and turned over to the U.S. Army by other Yakama as a peace offering. He was shot and killed by American soldiers while attempting escape.

== Personal life ==
Bolon was married; at the time of his death, his wife was pregnant.

== Legacy ==
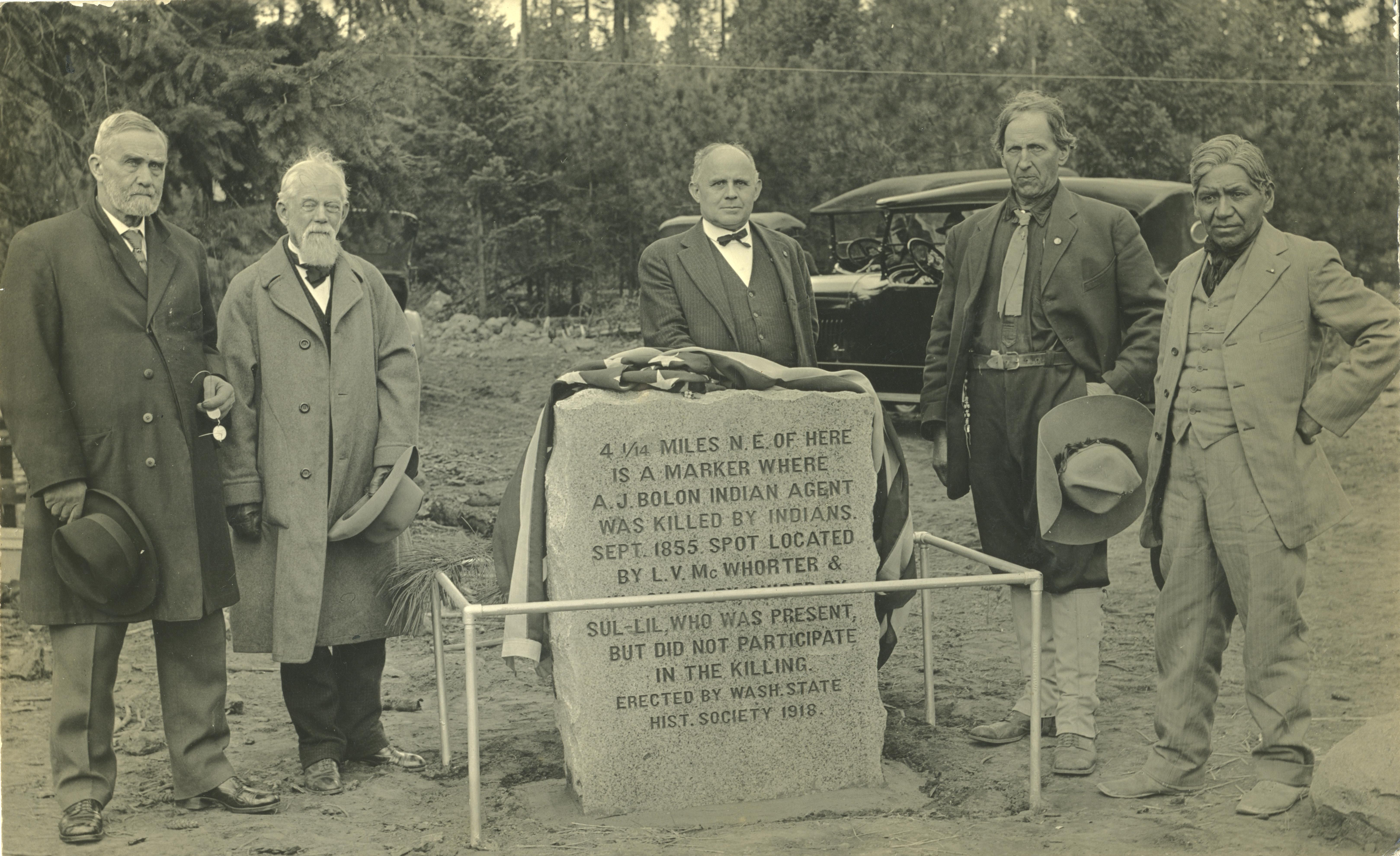
George H. Himes (secretary of the Oregon Historical Society), Gen. Hazard Stevens, W.T. Bonney (secretary of the Washington Historical Society), rancher Lucullus McWhorter, and Klickitat tribesman William Charley unveil a monument to Andrew Bolon in 1918.

Two monuments were established to Bolon in 1918 by the Washington State Historical Society. The first was placed at the site of his death in a remote area 24 miles outside Goldendale, Washington. (The site of Bolon's death had been revealed to McWhorter and a Klickitat, William Charley, by Suleil.) The second monument was placed at a more visible crossroads approximately four miles away from the first monument. Gen. Hazard Stevens, who was in frail health and would suffer the stroke that led to his death the following day, spoke at the dedication ceremony. During his address, Stevens eulogized Bolon as the best friend of the Yakama among the whites.

Bolon's name is also inscribed on the Washington Peace Officers Memorial, located adjacent to the Washington State Capitol in Olympia, Washington.
