= Kamkin =

Kamkin (masculine, Russian: Камкин) or Kamkina (feminine, Russian: Камкина) is a Russian surname. Notable people with the surname include:

- Aleksey Kamkin (born 1952), Russian rower
- Mikhail Kamkin (born 1985), Russian soccer player

== See also ==
- Victor Kamkin Bookstore, retail book shop with a main location in Rockville, Maryland
- Kakin
- Kamiakin (disambiguation)
