= Kamiakin =

Kamiakin and its variants Comiaken, Kamiakan, and Ka-mi-akin, may refer to:

- Chief Kamiakin (1800–1877), chief and war-leader of the Yakama
- Chief Kamiakin Elementary School, in Sunnyside, Washington
- Kamiakin High School, in Kennewick, Washington
- Kamiakin Middle School, a middle school in Kirkland, Washington
- Kamiakin's Gardens, a Registered Historic Place located in Union Gap, Washington

The name is often shortened to Kamiak, which is used in other place names, including:

- Kamiak High School, in Mukilteo, Washington
- Kamiak Butte, a summit in Whitman County, Washington
