= Colestah =

Yakama medicine woman

- Born: 1800s
- Died: 1865
- Known for: Yakama medicine woman; warrior who fought at Battle of Four Lakes
- Spouse: One of the five wives of Chief Kamiakin

Colestah (died 1865), was one of the five wives of Chief Kamiakin (1800–1877) of the Yakama Native American tribe. She is described as being a medicine woman (twati), a psychic, and a "warrior woman".

== Early life ==
Colestah was the youngest daughter of Chief Tenax (Klickitat). Her older sisters were Kem-ee-yowah, Why-luts-pum and Hos-ke-la-pum. She bore two children with Kamiakin: Tomeo and Tomomolow (Tomolio).

== Battle of Four Lakes ==
On September 5, 1858, she accompanied Kamiakin to the Battle of Four Lakes (or Battle of Spokane Plains) against Colonel George Wright, armed with a stone war club, vowing to fight by his side. According to the historian of criminal justice, Kurt R. Nelson, she dressed formally for the battle in "her finest" buckskin dress, with her hair braided tightly. When Kamiakin was seriously wounded by a branch dislodged by a howitzer shell, Colestah carried him back to the family camp located at the Spokane River and used her skills as an "Indian doctor" in traditional tribal medicine to nurse him back to health.

Colestah and Kamiakin moved to the Palouse River camp, between today's St. John and Endicott in 1860, where his family followed its "seasonal rounds of root-digging, berry-gathering and salmon fishing." Colestah had a new son, Tomolow, with Kamiakin in 1864, but then she became sick, and died in 1865.
