= Qualchan =

19th-century Yakama Native American chieftain

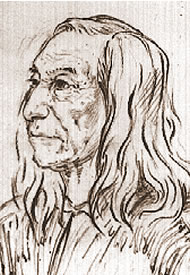
Qualchan's father, Owhi

Qualchan (died September 24, 1858) was a 19th-century Yakama chieftain who participated in the Yakama War with his Uncle Kamiakin and other chieftains.

Qualchan was born into the We-ow-icht family, reputed to have come from the stars. His spirit power was the mist, as was his father's, Owhi, the War Chief of the Yakamas. From their home in the Upper Yakima valley, Qualchan, his family, and friends traveled all over the Pacific Northwest, particularly over the Cascade Mountains to the area now known as Seattle, and across the Columbia River to the small town of Portland. He was trained as a warrior by his father and uncles.

Shortly after the Walla Walla council in 1855, in which Yakama leaders warned the United States against further settlement of the area, Qualchan and five others killed six miners on the Yakima River [see Yakima War - "Death of Mosheel's family"]. On September 23, U.S. Indian Agent Andrew Bolon was murdered by a band of Yakama while traveling along The Dalles to discuss the incident with Kamiakin [see Yakima War - "Death of Andrew Bolon"]. Qualchan was accused of leading the group which attacked him, although contemporaries such as A.J. Splawn insist Bolon's murder was carried out by Me-cheil, also a nephew of Kamiakin.

Becoming a wanted fugitive by U.S. authorities, he and his father Owhi participated in guerrilla warfare against the U.S. Army for over three years. Qualchan would frequently attack prospectors, miners and others, selling their supplies to The Dalles and other settlements in exchange for weapons and calicos. During one skirmish in mid-March 1856, he and Chief Leschi led an attack against Connell's Prairie but were driven back by militiamen under Gilmore Hays.

According to Assistant Adjutant General William W. Mackall, in a letter addressed to the Department of the Pacific at Fort Vancouver on June 18, 1858,

Kamiakin and Qualchan, cannot longer be permitted to remain at large or in the country, they must be surrendered or driven away, and no accommodation should be made with any who will harbor them; let all know that asylum given to either of these troublesome Indians, will be considered in future as evidence of a hostile intention on the part of the tribe.

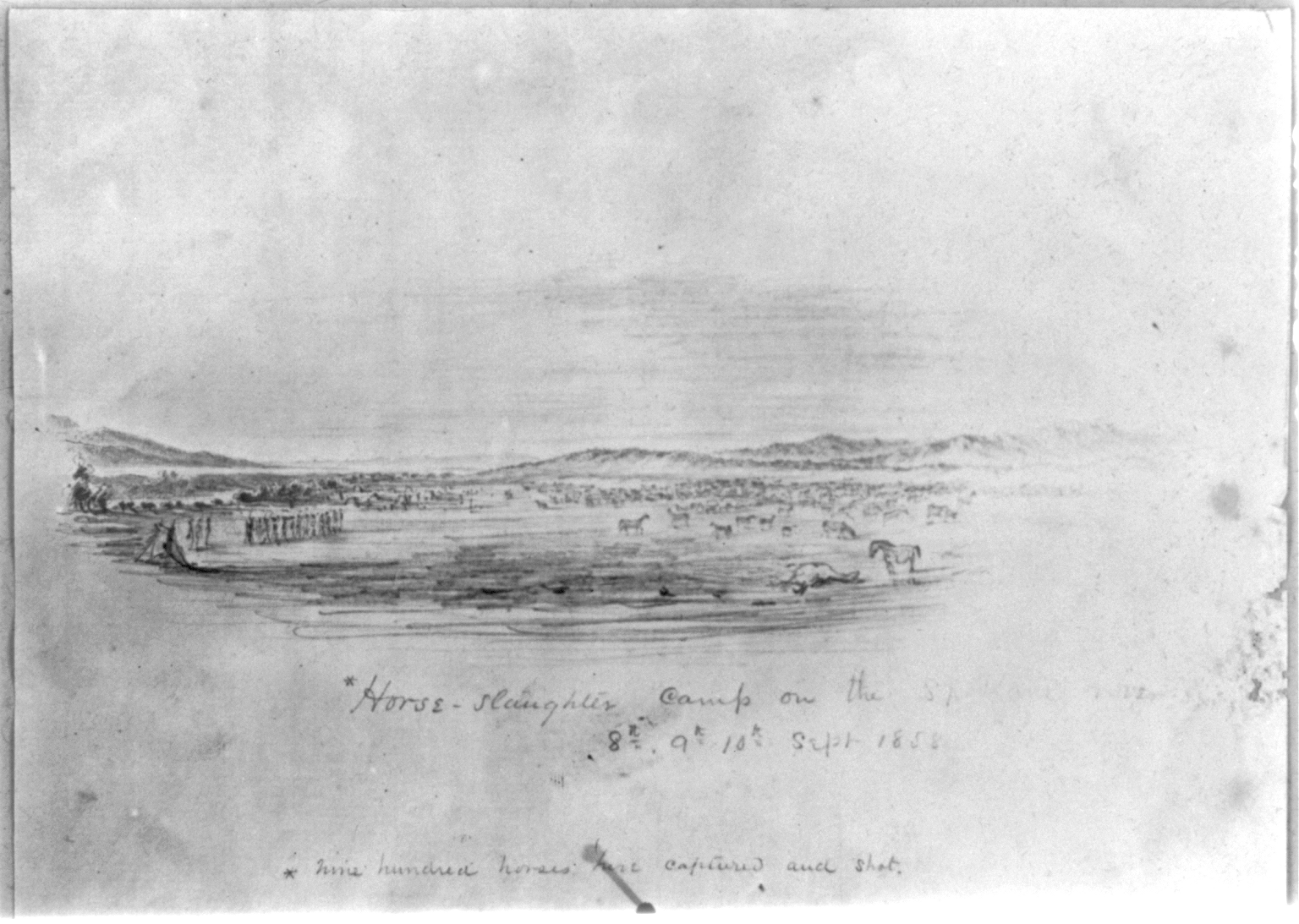
Depiction of the horse-slaughter camp on the Spokane River

Following the Horse Camp Slaughter and encouragement from Spokane runners, Owhi visited Colonel George Wright at his camp on Latah Creek intending to negotiate peace. During the meeting he was seized and put in irons. Wright told him that if his son didn't surrender within four days, Owhi was to be hanged. Despite Wright stating his intention to send Qualchan a message demanding he come to the camp, Native witnesses deny one was ever sent.

Qualchan regardless appeared at the tent of Wright soon enough, accompanied by his wife Whist-alks and brother Lo-Kout. It has been speculated that Qualchan may have been unaware that his father had been taken prisoner and instead had been sent by Kamiakin to determine from Wright the treatment the Yakama would receive if they surrendered. Some say he was captured in a brief gun battle while his wife and brother managed to escape. Qualchan's sister Mary Moses said Lo-kout and Qualchan's wife were captured, but released when the Spokane Indians assured the soldiers that they were no relation of Qualchan. The only record of the meeting exists in a report made by Colonel Wright who wrote "Qualchan came to see me at 9 o'clock, at 9:15 he was hung". Later records claim Qualchan cursed Kamiakin before being killed, though this was disputed by his family members alive at the time. His body was made nude after the garments were taken by the executors, who put the corpse partially covered in a shoal. His father was shot several days later attempting to escape from the camp, his saddle given to later Surgeon General Joseph Barnes.

== Legacy ==
- Qualchan had two younger brothers, Lo-kout (Quo-to-we-not) and Les-high-hite (Pe-noh), and several sisters: Wah-yah-kon, Quo-mollah, Sah-mah-yas, Si-en-wat, San-clow (Mary Moses) and Yam-kumkt. Chief Moses married Quo-mollah and, after Quo-mollah's death, San-clow; the latter (who died in 1939) gave an account of these things in Mary Moses's Statement.
- According to the United States Geological Survey, Latah Creek is officially named Hangman Creek as a result of Qualchan's execution.
- Qualchan is featured in a short story by author Sherman Alexie.
