= Battle of Toppenish Creek =

1855 battle of the Yakima War

- Part of the Yakima War, American Indian Wars
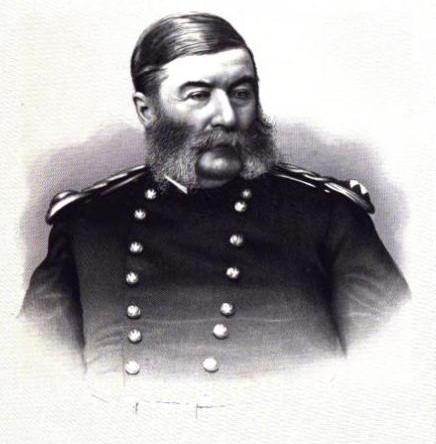
- Granville O. Haller in 1890.
| Date | October 5, 1855 |
| Location | Toppenish Creek, Washington |
| Result | Yakama victory |

Belligerents
| United States | Yakama |

Commanders and leaders
| (United States) Granville O. Haller | Kamiakin |

Strength
| 84 infantry | ~300 warriors |

Casualties and losses
| 5 killed 17 wounded | 2 killed 4 wounded 1 captured |

The Battle of Toppenish Creek was the first engagement of the Yakima War in Washington. Fought on October 5, 1855, a company of American soldiers, under Major Granville O. Haller, was attacked by a band of Yakamas, under Chief Kamiakin, and compelled to retreat. The battle occurred in Yakima Valley, 113 miles northwest of Fort Walla Walla, along Toppenish Creek and was a major victory for Native American forces.

== See also ==
- Cayuse War
- Whitman Massacre
