= Cutmouth John =

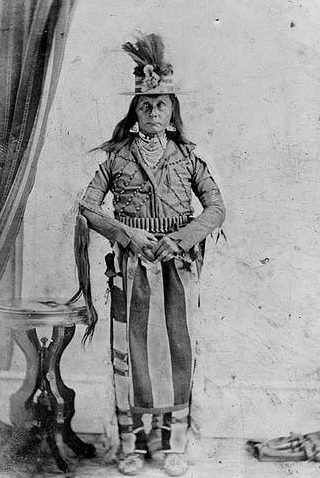
- Studio portrait of Cutmouth John, circa 1865.
- Military career
- Allegiance: United States
- Branch: United States Army
- Unit: United States Army Indian Scouts
- Conflicts: Yakima War

Cutmouth John, also known as Poor Crane and as Ya-Tin-Ee-Ah-Witz, Chief of the Cayuses, was a Native American who served in the U.S. Army Indian Scouts. His lineage unclear, some considered him a member of the Umatilla, or Wasco tribes.

== Guide ==
Poor Crane, as he was known at the time, was a guide and friend of Thomas J. Farnham and led him to the Whitman Mission in 1839, three years after it was founded. Poor Crane was described as a kind, middle-aged man who was a devoted father. He loaned Farnham his best saddle and had his two young sons accompany them on the journey to the mission.

== Whitman massacre ==
According to the journal of Lawrence Kip, a U.S. Army lieutenant, Cutmouth John was the guide to the 4th Infantry Regiment when it escorted Isaac Stevens to the Walla Walla Council in 1855. Kip explained Cutmouth John had previously lived near the Whitman mission prior to the massacre and been disfigured during a fight with Snake warriors in 1850 while hunting Marcus Whitman's killers.

During the Yakima War, Cutmouth John accompanied American troops at the Battle of Union Gap, during which it is believed he inflicted the only fatality on the Yakama forces during the encounter. Though occasionally popular among the Americans, Philip Sheridan reports that - in the aftermath of that battle - Cutmouth John paraded through the U.S. camp waving the scalp of the Yakama he'd killed and dressed in the Catholic vestments of Father Pandoza, the priest of St. Joseph's Mission which had been ransacked by territorial militia the day before. According to Sheridan, this "ghastly" demonstration "turned opinion against him." Nonetheless, Cutmouth John would later fight alongside U.S. troops at the Battle of Four Lakes.

== Legacy ==
In 1891 sculptor Olin Levi Warner made an 11-inch bronze sculpture plaque of Poor Crane, Ya-Tin-Ee-Ah-Witz, Chief of the Cayuses. It was one of six legendary Northwest Native Americans that Warner portrayed. Warner met Poor Crane in 1891 when he was the Chief of the Cayuses, living in northeastern Oregon on the Umatilla Reservation. He was described as "the embodiment of the wilderness, a creation of nature... He still keeps to the simple wants of the savage, still lives as he has always lived, accepting the good and evil of his life with fortitude, and above all things insists that a man needs only two virtues - bravery and truth."
