= Rock Creek (Palouse River tributary) =

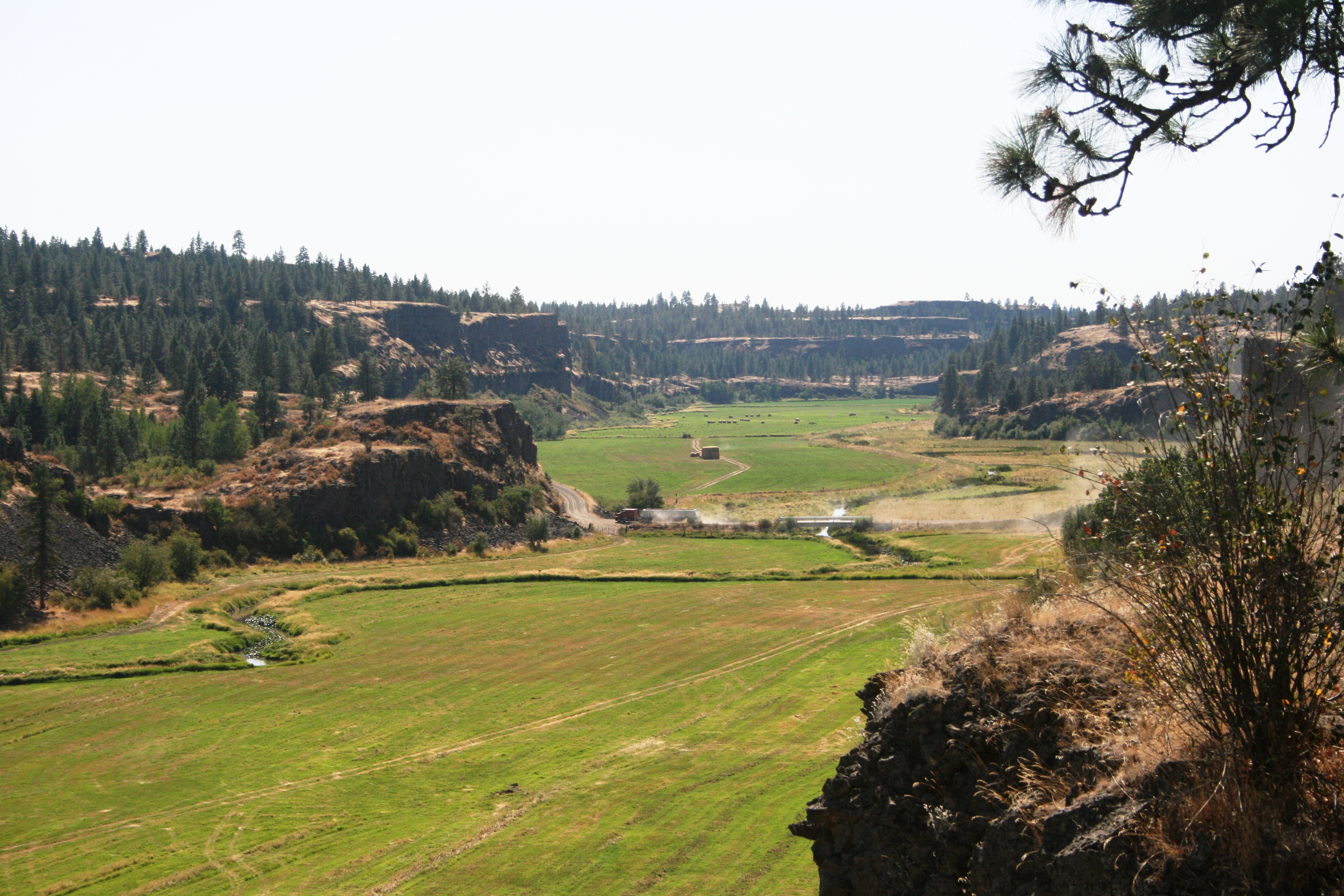
- Rock Creek flows through Hole in the Ground Coulee between Bonnie Lake and Rock Lake.

- Location of the mouth of Rock Creek in Washington

Location
- Country: United States
- State: Washington
- County: Spokane, Adams, Whitman

Physical characteristics
- Source: Turnbull National Wildlife Refuge
  - location: Pine Lakes, Spokane County
  - coordinates: 47°23′55″N 117°32′41″W
  - elevation: 2,226 ft (678 m)
- Mouth: Palouse River
  - location: near Winona, Whitman County
  - coordinates: 46°54′45″N 117°55′41″W
  - elevation: 1,280 ft (390 m)
- Length: 52 mi (84 km)
- Basin size: 430 sq mi (1,100 km^{2})

Rock Creek is a tributary of the Palouse River in the U.S. state of Washington. The source of the creek is Pine Lakes in the Turnbull National Wildlife Refuge (TNWR). The creek flows through the TNWR and ultimately joins the Palouse River 6 miles (10 km) downstream from the unincorporated town of Winona, Washington.

Rock Creek drains a basin of 430 square miles (1,100 km^{2}), 13 percent of the Palouse River basin. Rock Creek drains Rock Lake and, upstream from that, Bonnie Lake. Rock Lake has a maximum depth of 350 feet (110 m) and a mean depth of 170 feet (52 m). Lakes within the Rock Creek drainage with managed fisheries include Rock and Bonnie Lakes and Chapman Lake. Many small lakes in the drainage have no outlets, and some evaporate completely in dry weather.

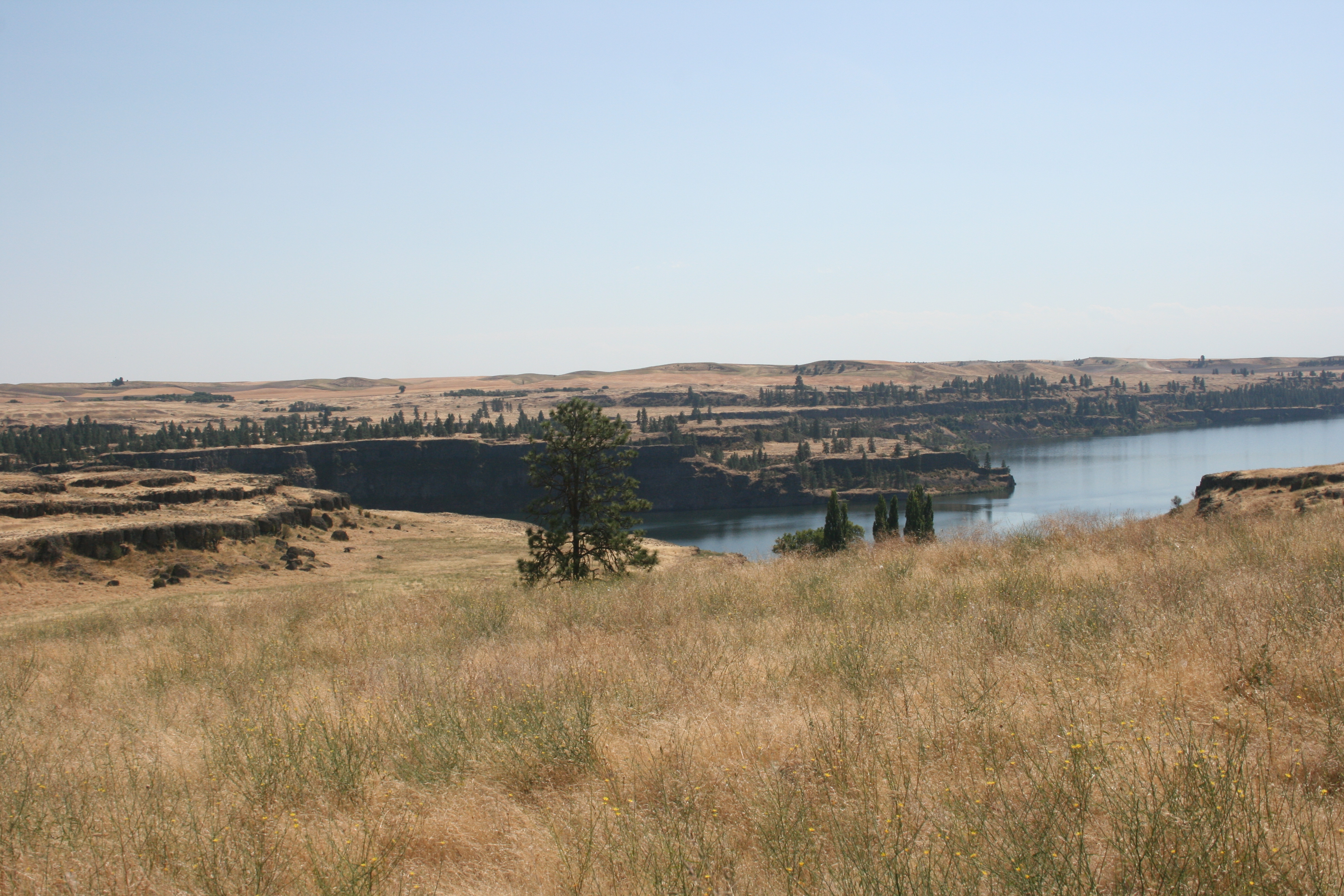
Trail along the east side of Rock Lake. An old rail grade is visible along the basalt walls of the lake.

== Geological significance ==
As Rock Creek crosses the Columbia River Plateau, it passes through the Channeled Scablands, created by the Missoula Floods that swept across eastern Washington during the Pleistocene epoch. The creek follows one of many paths taken by the floods as they cut through the Columbia River Basalt. Notable geologic features in the Rock Creek basin include the scabland and Rock Lake. The creek parallels the adjacent Cow Creek scabland and joins the Palouse River just before it departs Washtucna Coulee, the abandoned flood-scoured course of the river.

== Access ==
The Palouse to Cascades State Park Trail follows Rock Creek for a portion of the drainage, allowing unique access, particularly to Rock Lake.

== See also ==
- List of rivers of Washington (state)
