= Chief Kamiakin Elementary School =

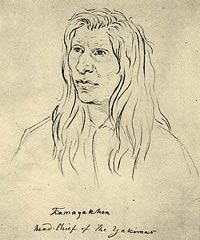
- Chief Kamiakin (school namesake) Credit: Washington State Historical Society

Location
- 1110 South 6th Street; Sunnyside, Yakima, Washington 98944; United States
- Coordinates: 46.3175°N 120.0133°W

Information
- School type: Public
- School district: Sunnyside School District
- Principal: Kimberly Frank
- Grades: 1-5
- Website: https://sunnyside-chiefkamiakin.ss5.sharpschool.com/

Chief Kamiakin Elementary School in Sunnyside, Washington, was the first public school to be named after the chief of the Yakama, Chief Kamiakin.

== History ==
Construction of the current school began in 1975 and was finished in 1976. It replaced an earlier building that burned down in 1974.

The original building housing Chief Kamiakin Elementary School was built in 1910 and initially served as Sunnyside's High School. That building was nearly destroyed by a fire on March 20, 1933, but was subsequently re-built. When a new three year high school was built in 1954, the old high school was converted into a junior high school for 7th, 8th, and 9th grades. When a new junior high school was built nearby in the late 1950s, the old building saw its final use as an elementary school beginning in 1960. It was at that time a contest to name the (now) elementary school resulted in what was called "the odd choice (so many people thought) of Chief Kamiakin". It served as one of the two public elementary schools in Sunnyside until it burned down on the morning of Tuesday, February 12, 1974. Investigators determined that the fire was caused either by a problem with electrical wiring or a faulty furnace on the ground floor of the building. Several months after the fire, young boys were paid to salvage bricks from the gutted building at 1.5 cents per brick.

Following the fire, Kamiakin students shared Washington Elementary School until the new building was finished. The new elementary school building was erected by V.K. Powell Construction of Wapato, Washington at a cost of $3.23 million. The building was financed by $500,000 in School District funds, $1 million in insurance payments, and $2 million from the state of Washington. The current school retains the name of Chief Kamiakin.
