= Yakima War =

19th-century conflict between the United States and the Yakama people

- Part of the American Indian Wars
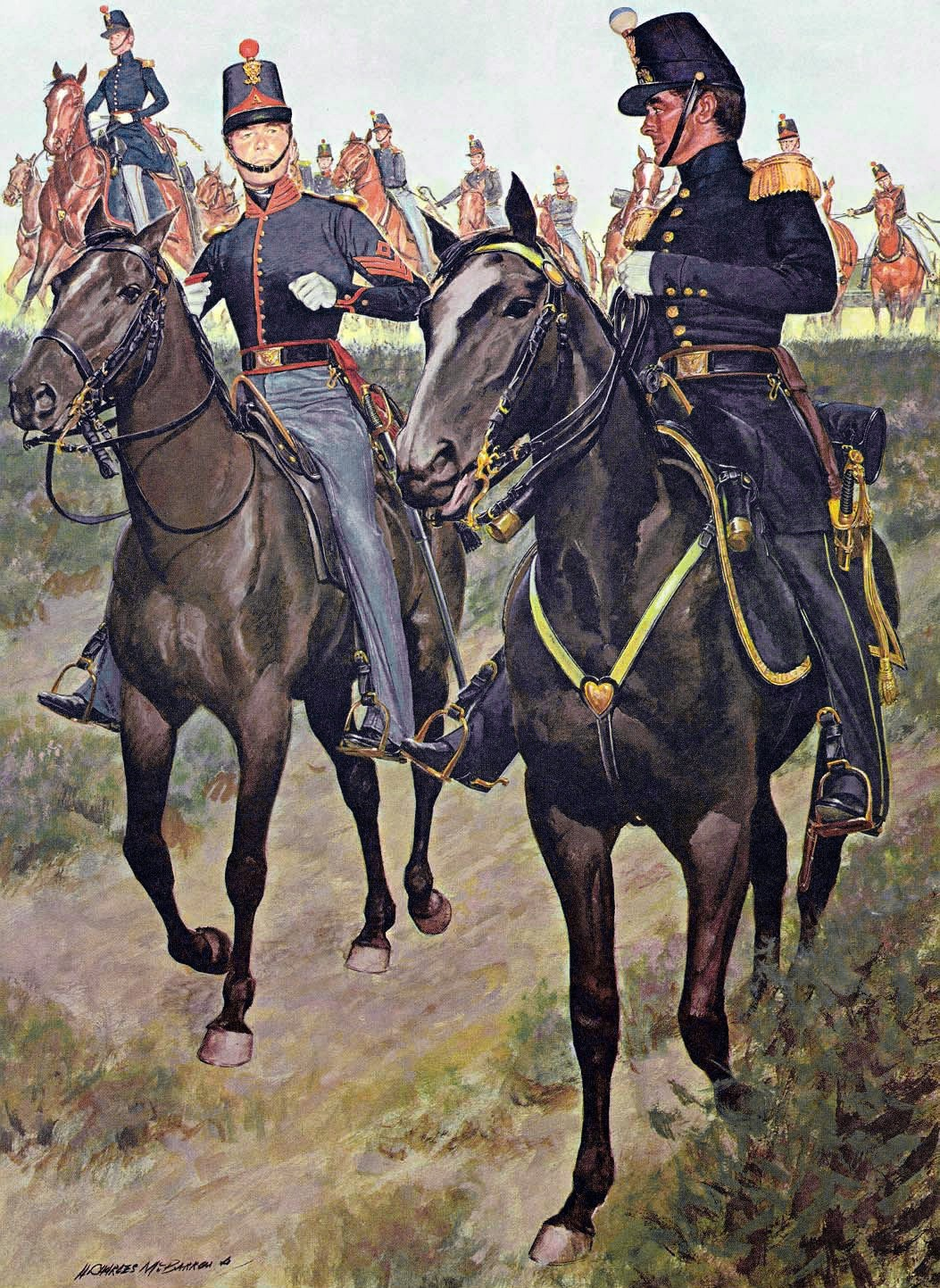
- Illustration of U.S. Army artillerymen in 1855
Date	1855–1858
Location	Washington Territory, United States
Result	United States victory

Belligerents
United States; Snoqualmie	Yakama; Walla Walla; Umatilla; Nisqually; Cayuse; Palouse; Puyallup; Klickitat; Syilx

Commanders and leaders
Isaac Stevens; Joel Palmer; George Wright; Chief Patkanim	Chief Kamiakin; Chief Leschi; Chief Kanaskat

Units involved
4th Infantry Regiment; 6th Infantry Regiment; 9th Infantry Regiment; 3rd Artillery Regiment; Washington militia Oregon militia USS Decatur; Snoqualmie warriors	Yakama warriors Walla Walla warriors Umatilla warriors Nisqually warriors Cayuse warriors Palouse warriors Puyallup warriors Klickitat warriors

The Yakima War (1855–1858), also referred to as the Plateau War or Yakima Indian War, was a conflict between the United States and the Yakama, a Sahaptian-speaking people of the Northwest Plateau, then part of Washington Territory, and the tribal allies of each. It primarily took place in the southern interior of present-day Washington. Isolated battles in western Washington and the northern Inland Empire are sometimes separately referred to as the Puget Sound War and the Coeur d'Alene War, respectively.

== Background ==
After the Washington Territory was formally organized as a U.S. territory in 1853, treaties between the United States government and several Indian tribes in the area resulted in reluctant tribal recognition of U.S. sovereignty over a vast amount of land within the new territory. In return for this recognition, the tribes were entitled to receive half of the fish in the territory in perpetuity, awards of money and provisions, and reserved lands where white settlement would be prohibited.

While territorial governor Isaac Stevens had guaranteed the inviolability of Native American territory following tribal accession to the treaties, he lacked the legal authority to enforce it pending ratification of the agreements by the United States Senate. Meanwhile, the widely publicized discovery of gold in Yakama territory prompted an influx of unruly prospectors who traveled, unchecked, across the newly defined tribal lands, to the growing consternation of Indian leaders. In 1855 two of these prospectors were killed by Qualchan, the nephew of Kamiakin, after it was discovered they had raped a Yakama woman.

== Outbreak of hostilities ==
=== Death of Mosheel’s family ===
A party of American miners came across two Yakama women, a mother and daughter traveling together with a baby. The miners assaulted and killed both women and the infant. The husband and father of the women, a Yakama man named Mosheel, collected two friends, one of whom was Qualchin, and the men tracked down the miners who had killed Mosheel’s family. They ambushed the murderers in their camp and killed all of them.

=== Death of Andrew Bolon ===
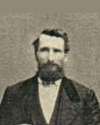
The murder of BIA agent Andrew Bolon is considered an immediate cause of the war.

On September 20, 1855, Bureau of Indian Affairs agent Andrew Bolon, hearing of the death of the prospectors at the hands of Qualchin, departed for the scene on horseback to investigate but was intercepted by the Yakama chief Shumaway, who warned him Qualchin was too dangerous to confront. Heeding Shumaway's warning, Bolon turned back and began the ride home. En route he came upon a group of Yakama traveling south and decided to ride along with them. One of the members of this group was Mosheel, Shumaway's son. After Bolon told Mosheel that the death of the miners was considered a wrongdoing and would be punished by United States army soon as he returned home, Mosheel grew angry. At some point, he decided Bolon should be killed. Though a number of Yakama in the traveling party protested, their objections were overruled by Mosheel, who invoked his regal status. Discussions about Bolon's fate took place over much of the day (Bolon, who did not speak Yakama, was unaware of this debate as it unfolded among his traveling companions).

During a rest stop, as Bolon and the Yakama were eating lunch, Mosheel and at least three other Yakama set upon him with knives. Bolon yelled out in Chinook Jargon, "I did not come to fight you!" before being stabbed in the throat. Bolon's horse was then shot, and his body and personal effects burned.

=== Battle of Toppenish Creek ===
When Shumaway heard of Bolon's death he immediately sent an ambassador to inform the U.S. Army garrison at Fort Dalles, before calling for the arrest of his own son, Mosheel, who he said should be turned over to the territorial government in order to forestall the American retaliation he felt would likely occur. A Yakama council overruled the chief, however, siding with Shumaway's older brother, Kamiakin, who called for war preparations. Meanwhile, district commander Gabriel Rains had received Shumaway's ambassador and, in response to the news of Bolon's death, ordered Major Granville O. Haller to move out with an expeditionary column from Fort Dalles. Haller's force was met and turned back at the edge of Yakama territory by a large group of Yakama warriors. As Haller withdrew, his company was engaged and routed by the Yakama at the Battle of Toppenish Creek.

== War spreads ==
The death of Bolon and the United States defeat at Toppenish Creek caused panic across the Washington Territory, provoking fears that an Indian uprising was in progress. The same news emboldened the Yakama and many uncommitted bands rallied to Kamiakin.

Rains, who had just 350 federal troops under his immediate command, urgently appealed to Acting Governor Charles Mason (Isaac Stevens was still returning from Washington, D.C. where he had traveled to present the treaties to the Senate for ratification) for military aid, writing that

... all the disposable force in the district will at once take the field, and I have the honor to make a requisition upon you for two companies of volunteers to take the field the earliest possible moment. The composition of these companies to be as follows: One Captain, one First Lieutenant and one Second Lieutenant, two musicians, four Sergeants, four Corporals and seventy four privates. The greatest exertions should be made to raise and equip these companies at once.

Meanwhile, Oregon Governor George Law Curry mobilized a cavalry regiment of 800 men, a portion of which crossed into Washington Territory in early November. Now with more than 700 troops at his disposal, Rains prepared to march on Kamiakin, who had encamped at Union Gap with 300 warriors.

=== Raid on the White River settlements ===
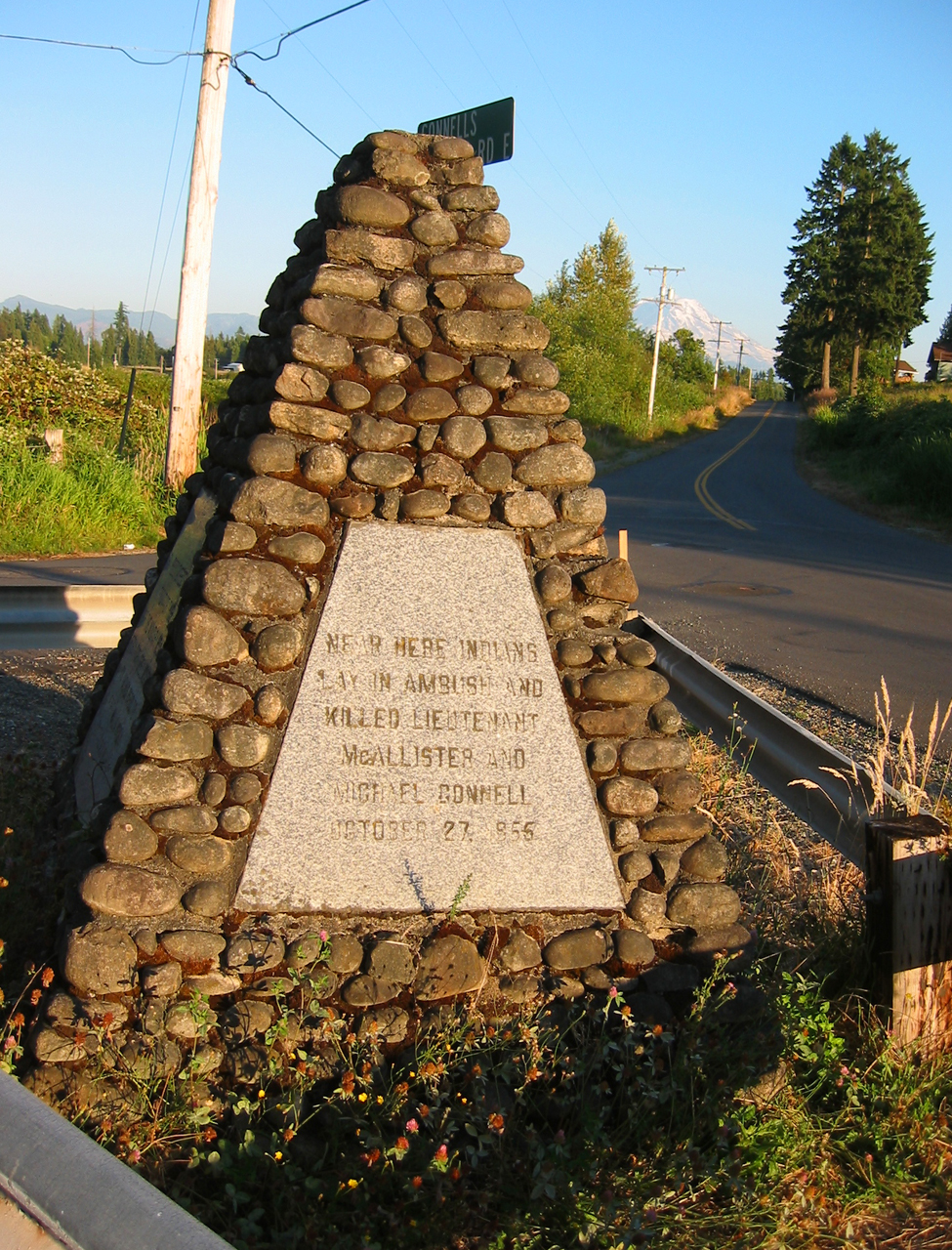
Marker at the site of the ambush of McAllister and Connell, photographed in 2005

As Rains was mustering his forces in Pierce County, Leschi, a Nisqually chief who was half Yakama, had sought to forge an alliance among the Puget Sound tribes to bring war to the doorstep of the territorial government. Starting with just the 31 warriors in his own band, Leschi rallied more than 150 Muckleshoot, Puyallup, and Klickitat, though other tribes rebuffed Leschi's overtures. In response to news of Leschi's growing army, a volunteer troop of 18 dragoons, known as Eaton's Rangers, was dispatched to arrest the Nisqually chief.

On October 27, while surveying an area of the White River, ranger James McAllister and farmer Michael Connell were ambushed and killed by Leschi's men. The rest of Eaton's Rangers were besieged inside an abandoned cabin, where they would remain for the next four days before escaping. The next morning Muckleshoot and Klickitat warriors raided three settler cabins along the White River, killing nine men and women. Many settlers had left the area in advance of the raid, having been warned of danger by Chief Kitsap of the neutral Suquamish. Details of the raid on the White River settlements were told by John King, one of the four survivors, who was seven years old at the time and was – along with two younger siblings spared by the attackers and told to head west. The King children eventually came upon a local Native American known to them as Tom.

I told him of the massacre. He said he suspected something of the kind, as he had heard firing in that direction. He told me that I should get the children and take them to his wigwam, adding that 'when the moon was high' he would take us to Seattle in his canoe. His squaw was as kind and amiable as could be, and did all in her power to make it pleasant for us, but the children were very shy. She set out dried fish and whortleberries for our repast, but nothing she could do would induce them to go to her. Our hunger was so great that the various and penetrating odors permeating the food she had brought us was no bar to our relish for it as I remember.

Leschi would later express regret for the raid on the White River settlements and post-war accounts given by Nisqually in his band affirmed that the chief had rebuked his commanders who had organized the attack.

=== Battle of White River ===
Army Captain Maurice Maloney, in command of a reinforced company of 243 men, had previously been sent east to cross the Naches Pass and enter the Yakama homeland from the rear. Finding the pass blocked with snow he began returning west in the days following the raid on the White River settlements. On November 2, 1855 Leschi's men were spotted by the vanguard of Maloney's returning column, and fell back to the right bank of the White River.

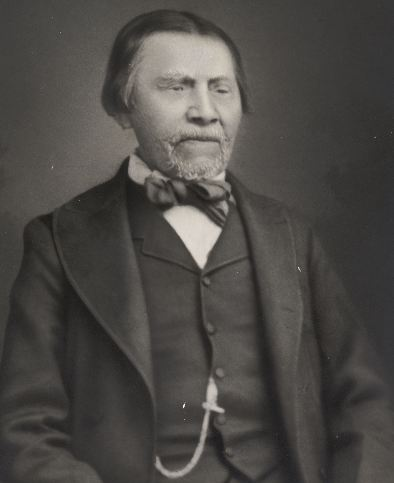
Tyee Dick, pictured here later in life, was one of Leschi's soldiers at the Battle of White River. After the war he would rise to the chiefdom of the Puyallup.

On November 3 Maloney ordered a force of 100 men under Lt. William Slaughter to cross the White River and engage Leschi's forces. Attempts to ford the river, however, were stopped by the fire of Indian sharpshooters. One American soldier was killed in a back-and-forth exchange of gunfire. Accounts of Indian fatalities range from one (reported by a Puyallup Indian, Tyee Dick, after the end of the war) to 30 (claimed in Slaughter's official report), though the lower number may be more credible (one veteran of the battle, Daniel Mounts, would later be appointed Indian agent to the Nisqually and heard Tyee Dick's casualty numbers confirmed by Nisqually). At four o'clock, when it was becoming too dark for the Americans to cross the White River, Leschi's men fell back three miles to their camp on the banks of the Green River, jubilant at having successfully prevented the American crossing (Tyee Dick would later describe the battle as hi-ue he-he, hi-ue he-he - "lots and lots of fun" in Chinook Jargon).

The next morning Maloney advanced with 150 men across the White River and attempted to engage Leschi at his camp at the Green River, but poor terrain made the advance untenable and he quickly called off the attack. Another skirmish on November 5 resulted in five American fatalities, but no Indian deaths. Unable to make any headway, Maloney began his withdrawal from the area on November 7, arriving at Fort Steilacoom two days later.

=== Battle of Union Gap ===
One hundred fifty miles to the east, on November 9, Rains closed with Kamiakin near Union Gap. The Yakama had erected a defensive barrier of stone breastwork which was quickly blown away by American artillery fire. Kamiakan had not expected a force of the size Rains had mustered and the Yakama, anticipating a quick victory of the kind they had recently scored at Toppenish Creek, had brought their families. Kamiakan now ordered the women and children to flee as he and the warriors fought a delaying action. While leading a reconnaissance of the American lines, Kamiakan and a group of fifty mounted warriors encountered an American patrol which gave chase. Kamiakan and his men escaped across the Yakima River; the Americans were unable to keep up and two soldiers drowned before the pursuit was called off.

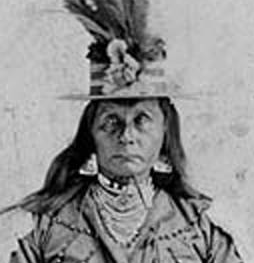
Cutmouth John, a U.S. Army Indian scout, is believed to have inflicted the only fatality on the Yakama at Union Gap.

That evening Kamiakan called a war council where it was decided the Yakama would make a stand in the hills of Union Gap. Rains began advancing on the hills the next morning, his progress slowed by small groups of Yakama employing hit and run tactics to delay the American advance against the main Yakama force. At four o'clock in the afternoon Maj. Haller, backed by a howitzer bombardment, led a charge against the Yakama position. Kamiakan's forces scattered into the brush at the mouth of Ahtanum Creek and the American offensive was called off.

In Kamiakan's camp, plans for a night raid against the American force were drawn up but abandoned. Instead, early the next day, the Yakama continued their defensive retreat, tiring American forces who eventually broke off the engagement. In the last day of fighting the Yakama suffered their only fatality, a warrior killed by U.S. Army Indian Scout Cutmouth John.

Rains continued to Saint Joseph's Mission which had been abandoned, the priests having joined the Yakama in flight. During a search of the grounds, Rains' men discovered a barrel of gunpowder, leading them to erroneously believe the priests had been secretly arming the Yakama. A riot among the soldiers ensued and the mission was burned to the ground. With snow beginning to fall, Rains ordered a withdrawal, and the column returned to Fort Dalles.

=== Skirmish at Brannan's Prairie ===
By the end of November, federal troops had returned to the White River area. A detachment of the 4th Infantry Regiment, under Lt. Slaughter, accompanied by militia under Capt. Gilmore Hays, searched the area from which Maloney had previously withdrawn and engaged Nisqually and Klickitat warriors at Biting's Prairie on November 25, 1855, resulting in several casualties but no decisive outcome. The next day an Indian sharpshooter killed two of Slaughter's troops. Finally, on December 3, as Slaughter and his men were camped for the night on Brannan's Prairie, the force was fired upon and Slaughter killed. News of the death of Slaughter greatly demoralized settlers in the principal towns. Slaughter and his wife were a popular young couple among the settlers and the legislature adjourned for a day of mourning.

=== Conflict of command ===
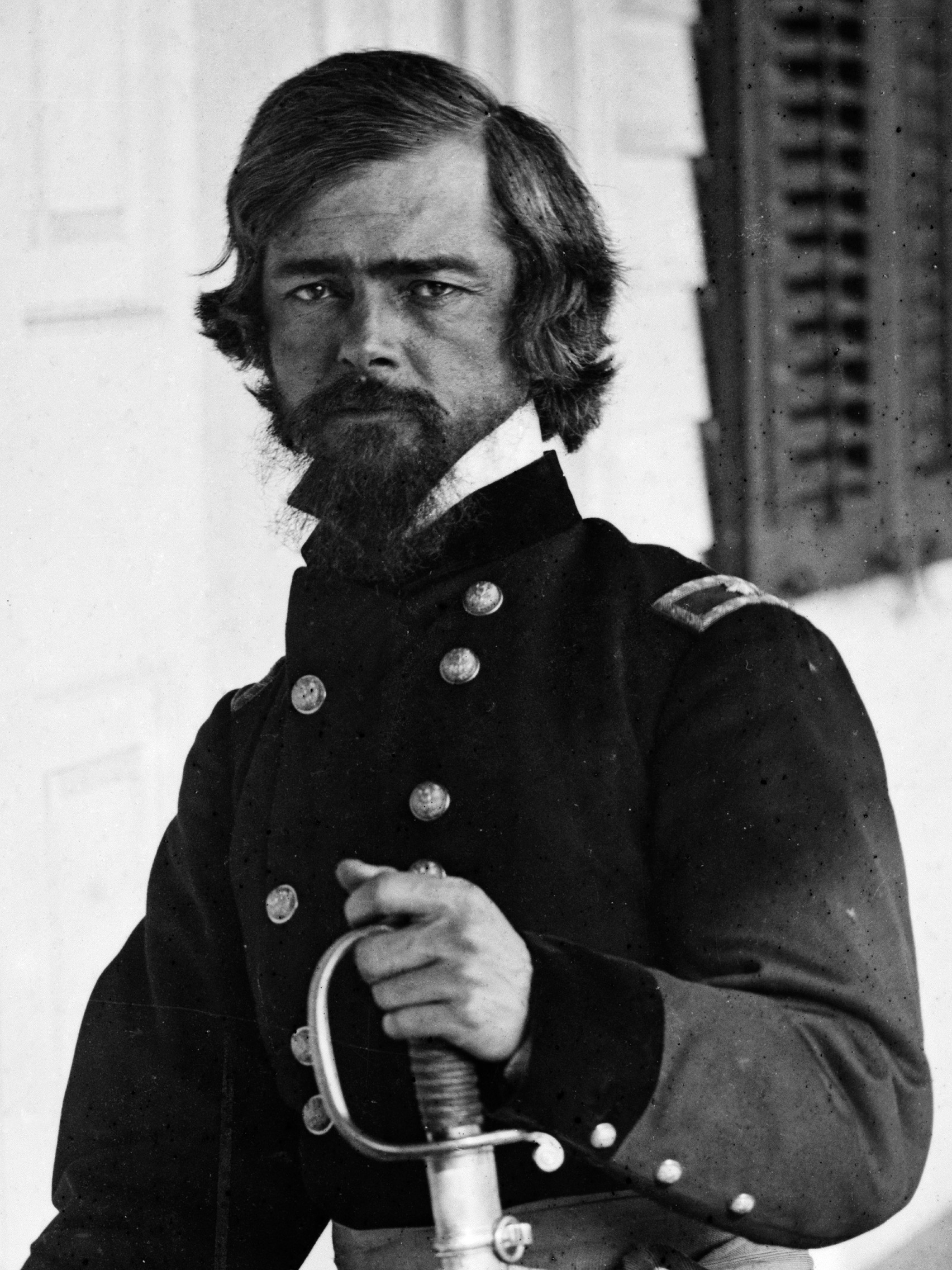
Washington governor Isaac Stevens, pictured here in 1862, was joined by Oregon governor John Curry in calling for the dismissal of Gen. Wool.

In late November 1855 Gen. John E. Wool arrived from California and assumed control of the United States side in the conflict, making his headquarters at Fort Vancouver. Wool was widely considered pompous and arrogant and had been criticized by some for blaming much of the Western conflicts between Natives and whites on whites. After assessing the situation in Washington, he decided that Rains' approach of chasing bands of Yakama around the territory would lead to an inevitable defeat. Wool planned to wage a static war by using the territorial militia to fortify the major settlements while better-trained and equipped U.S. Army regulars moved in to occupy traditional Indian hunting and fishing grounds, starving the Yakama into surrender.

To Wool's chagrin, however, Oregon Governor Curry decided to launch a preemptive and largely unprovoked attack against the eastern tribes of the Walla Walla, Palouse, Umatilla, and Cayuse who had, up to that point, remained cautiously neutral in the conflict (Curry believed it was only a matter of time before the eastern tribes entered the war and sought to gain a strategic advantage by attacking first). Oregon militia, under Lt. Col. James Kelley, crossed into the Walla Walla Valley in December, skirmishing with the tribes and, eventually, capturing Peopeomoxmox and several other chiefs. The eastern tribes were now firmly involved in the conflict, a state-of-affairs Wool blamed squarely on Curry. In a letter to a friend, Wool commented that

But for the ... barbarous determination of the Oregonians to exterminate its Indians, I would soon put an end to the Indian War. It is these shocking barbarities that give us more trouble than all else and are constantly increasing the ranks of the hostiles.

Meanwhile, on December 20, Washington Governor Isaac Stevens had finally made it back to the territory after a perilous journey that involved a final, mad dash across the hostile Walla Walla Valley. Dissatisfied with Wool's plan to wait until spring before resuming military operations, and having learned of the raid on the White River settlement, Stevens convened the Washington Legislature where he declared "the war shall be prosecuted until the last hostile Indian is exterminated. Stevens was further perturbed at the lack of a military escort afforded him during his dangerous passage through Walla Walla and went on to denounce Wool for "the criminal neglect of my safety." Oregon Governor Curry joined his Washington counterpart in demanding Wool's dismissal. (The matter came to a head in the fall of 1856 and Wool was reassigned by the Army to command of the Eastern Department.)

== 1856 ==
=== Battle of Seattle ===
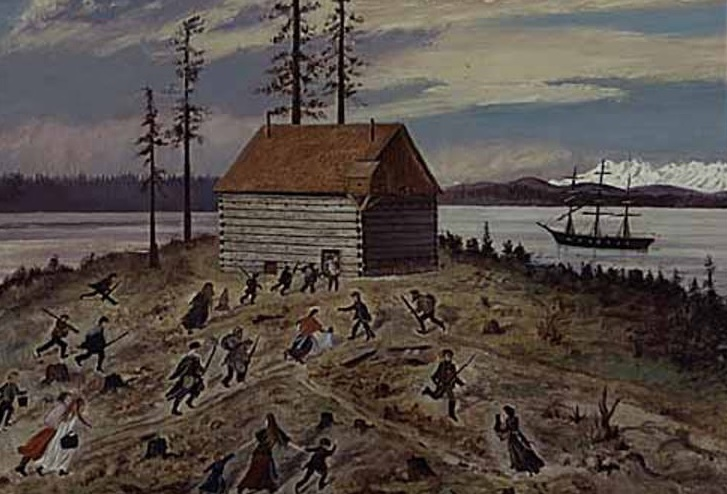
Seattleites evacuate to the town blockhouse as USS Decatur opens fire on advancing tribal forces.

In late January 1856, Stevens arrived in Seattle aboard the USCS Active to reassure citizens of the town. Stevens confidently declared that, "I believe that New York and San Francisco will as soon be attacked by the Indians as the town of Seattle." Even as Stevens was speaking, however, a 6,000-man tribal army was moving on the unsuspecting settlement. As the governor's ship was sailing from the harbor - carrying Stevens back to Olympia - members of some of the Puget Sound's neutral tribes began streaming into Seattle requesting sanctuary from a large Yakama war party that had just crossed Lake Washington. The threat was confirmed with the arrival of Princess Angeline who brought news from her father, Chief Seattle, that an attack was imminent. Doc Maynard began the evacuation of women and children from the neutral Duwamish, by boat, to the west side of Puget Sound while a group of citizen volunteers, led by the marine detachment of the nearby-anchored USS Decatur, started construction on a blockhouse.

On the evening of January 24, 1856, two scouts from the massing tribal forces, dressed in disguise and talking their way past American sentries, covertly entered Seattle on a reconnaissance mission (some believe one of these scouts may have been Leschi himself).

Just after sunrise on January 25, 1856, American lookouts spotted a large group of Indians approaching the settlement under cover of trees. The USS Decatur began firing into the woods, prompting townspeople to evacuate to the blockhouse. Tribal forces - by some accounts composed of Yakama, Walla Walla, Klickitat and Puyallup - returned fire with small arms and began a fast advance on the settlement. Faced with unrelenting fire from Decatur's guns, however, the attackers were forced to withdraw and regroup, after which a decision was made to abandon the assault. Two Americans lost their lives in the fighting and 28 Natives were killed.

=== Snoqualmie operations ===
To block the passes across the Cascade Mountains and prevent further Yakama movements against western Washington, a small redoubt was established near Snoqualmie Falls by Tokul Creek in February 1856. Fort Tilton became operational in March 1856, consisting of a blockhouse and several storehouses. The fort was manned by a small contingent of Volunteers supported by a 100-man force of Snoqualmie warriors, fulfillment of an agreement made by the powerful Snoqualmie chief Patkanim with the government the previous November.

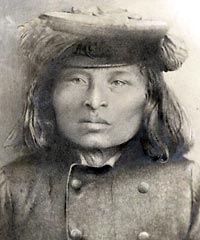
Snoqualmie chief Patkanim led a raid on Leschi's camp in winter of 1856 but the elusive Nisqually chief avoided capture.

Meanwhile, Leschi, having successfully repelled and evaded the previous American attempts to defeat his forces along the White River, now faced a third wave of attack. As construction on Fort Tilton got underway, Patkanim - brevetted to the rank of captain in the Volunteers - set out at the head of a force of 55 Snoqualmie and Snohomish warriors intent on capturing Leschi. Their mission was triumphantly announced by a headline in Olympia's Pioneer and Democrat "Pat Kanim in the Field!"

Patkanim tracked Leschi to his camp along the White River, but a planned night raid was aborted after a barking dog alerted sentries. Instead, Patkanim approached within speaking distance of Leschi's camp, announcing to the Nisqually chief, "I will have your head." Early the next morning Patkanim began his assault, the bloody fight reportedly lasting ten hours, ending only after the Snoqualmie ran out of ammunition. Edmond Meany would later write that Patkanim returned with "gruesome evidence of his battles in the form of heads taken from the bodies of slain hostile Indians." Leschi's, however, was not among them.

=== Martial law declared ===
By spring of 1856, Stevens began to suspect that some settlers in Pierce County, who had married into area tribes, were secretly conspiring with their Native American in-laws against the territorial government. Stevens' distrust of the Pierce County settlers may have been heightened by the strong Whig Party sentiment in the county and opposition to Democratic policies. Stevens ordered the suspect farmers arrested and held at Camp Montgomery. When Judge Edward Lander ordered their release, Stevens declared martial law in Pierce and Thurston counties. On May 12 Lander ruled that Stevens was in contempt of court. Marshals sent to Olympia to detain the governor were ejected from the capitol and Stevens ordered Judge Lander's arrest by militia.

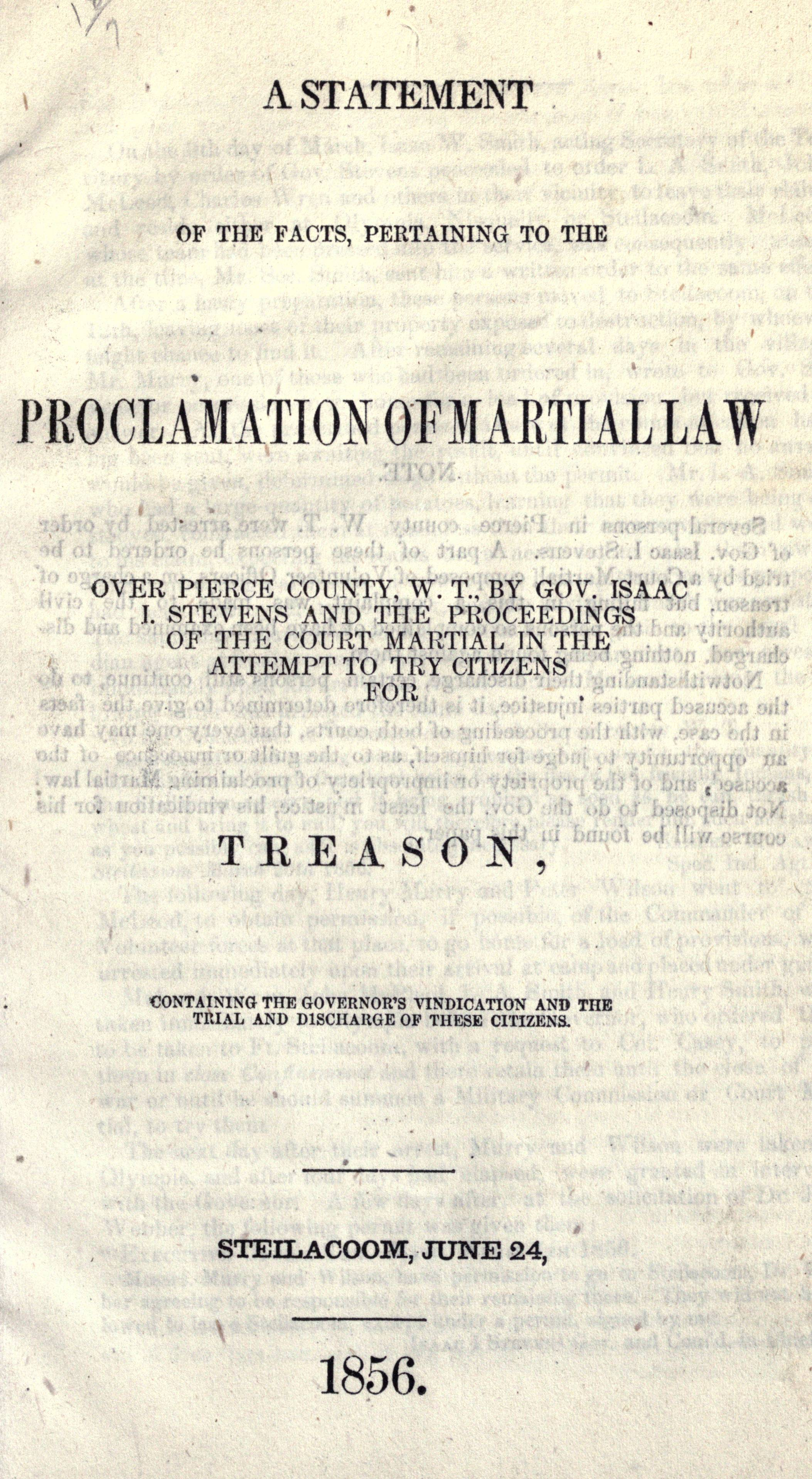

Learning of Lander's detention, Francis A. Chenoweth, the chief justice of the territorial supreme court, left Whidbey Island - where he was recuperating from illness - and traveled by canoe to Pierce County. Arriving in Steilacoom, Chenoweth reconvened the court and prepared to again issue writs of habeas corpus ordering the release of the settlers. Learning of Chenoweth's arrival in Pierce County, Stevens sent a company of militia to stop the chief justice, but the troops were met by the Pierce County Sheriff whom Chenoweth had ordered to raise a posse to defend the court. The impasse was finally resolved after Stevens agreed to back down and release the farmers.

Stevens subsequently pardoned himself of contempt, but the United States Senate called for his removal over the incident and he was censured by the Secretary of State of the United States who wrote to him that "... your conduct, in that respect, does not therefore meet with the favorable regard of the President."

=== The Cascades Massacre ===
The Cascades Massacre on March 26, 1856 was the name given to an attack by a coalition of tribes against white soldiers and settlers in the Cascades Rapids. The native attackers included warriors from the Yakama, Klickitat, and Cascades tribes (today identified as belonging to Wasco tribes: Cascades Indians / Watlala or Hood River Wasco). Fourteen settlers and three US soldiers died in the attack, the most losses for US citizens during the Yakima War. The United States sent reinforcements the following day to defend against further attacks. The Yakama people fled, but nine Cascades Indians who surrendered without a fight, including Chenoweth, Chief of the Hood River Band, were improperly charged and executed for treason.

=== Puget Sound War ===
The U.S. Army arrived in the region in the summer of 1856. That August Robert S. Garnett supervised the construction of Fort Simcoe as a military post. Initially the conflict was limited to the Yakama, but eventually the Walla Walla and Cayuse were drawn into the war, and carried out a number of raids and battles against the American settlers.

=== Coeur d'Alene War ===
The last phase of the conflict, sometimes referred to as the Coeur d'Alene War, occurred in 1858. General Newman S. Clarke commanded the Department of the Pacific and sent a force under Col. George Wright to deal with the recent fighting. At the Battle of Four Lakes near Spokane, Washington in September 1858, Wright inflicted a decisive defeat on the Native Americans. He called a council of all the local Native Americans at Latah Creek (southwest of Spokane). On September 23 he imposed a peace treaty, under which most of the tribes were to go to reservations.

== Aftermath ==
As the war wound to a close, Kamiakin fled north to British Columbia. Leschi was twice tried for murder by the territorial government (his first trial resulted in a hung jury), convicted the second time, and then hanged outside Fort Steilacoom, the U.S. Army having refused to allow his execution to occur on Army property as military commanders considered him a lawful combatant. (In 2004 a Historical Court, convened by the State of Washington, conceded the Army's opinion and posthumously acquitted Leschi of murder.)

U.S. Army Indian scouts tracked and captured Andrew Bolon's murderers who were subsequently hanged.

Snoqualmie warriors were sent to hunt-down remnant hostile forces, with the territorial government agreeing to pay a bounty on scalps; however, the practice was quickly terminated by orders of the territorial auditor after questions arose as to whether the Snoqualmie were actually engaging remnant hostiles, or executing their own slaves.

By 1858, the Yakama had lost 90 percent of their traditional lands and were confined to a reservation. Their ability to gather their traditional foods all but destroyed, many took refuge in traditional beliefs, hoping that in time these practices would drive out the whites and restore their lands. The Yakama people were forced onto a reservation south of the present city of Yakima.

== See also ==
- Bannock War
- Cayuse War
- Fort Dalles
- Fraser Canyon War
- Nez Perce War
- Okanagan Trail
- Rogue River War
- Spokane-Coeur d'Alene-Paloos War

== Literature ==
- Hubert H. Bancroft, History Of Washington, Idaho, and Montana, 1845-1889 San Francisco: The History Company, 1890. Chapter VI: Indian Wars 1855-1856, and V :Indian Wars 1856-1858
- Ray Hoard Glassley: Indian Wars of the Pacific Northwest, Binfords & Mort, Portland, Oregon 1972 ISBN 0-8323-0014-4
