= Rock Lake (Washington) =

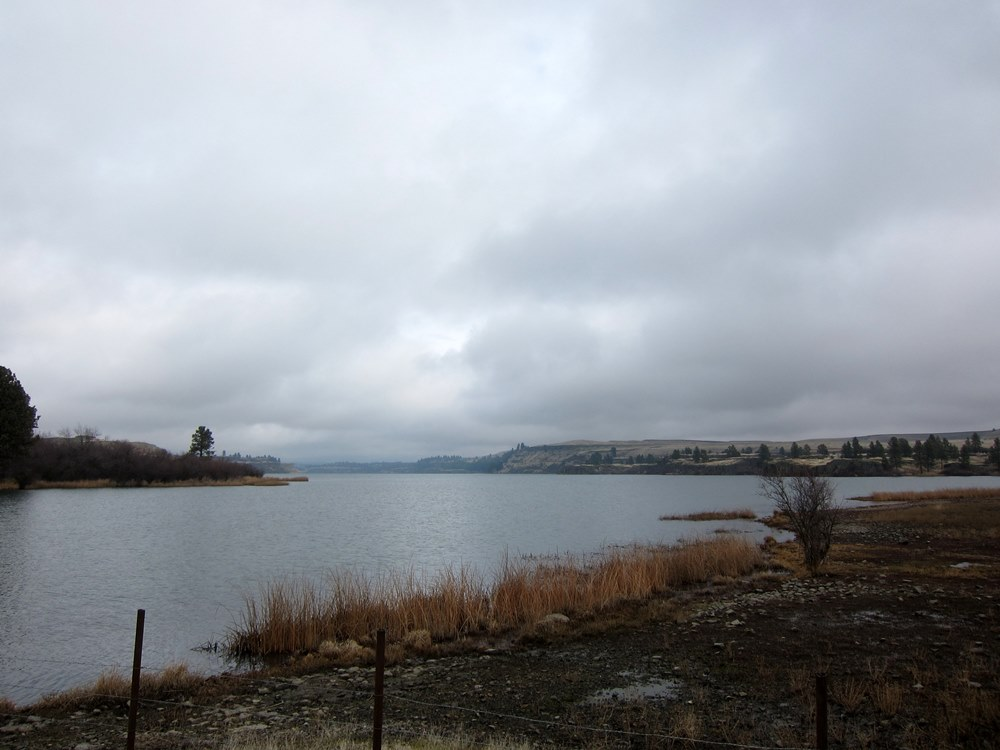
- View of Rock Lake from south end

- Location within Washington (state) Location within the United States
- Location: Whitman County, WA
- Coordinates: 47°10′40″N 117°41′01″W
- Type: Kolk lake
- Primary inflows: Rock Creek
- Primary outflows: Rock Creek
- Basin countries: United States
- Max. length: 7 mi (11 km)
- Max. width: 1 mi (1.6 km)
- Surface area: 2,190 acres (890 ha)
- Max. depth: 375 feet (114 m)
- Surface elevation: 1,728 ft (527 m)
- Settlements: St. John

Rock Lake is the deepest and largest of all scabland lakes left behind from the Missoula Floods, and holds that distinction for all of eastern Washington. At its deepest, it is more than 360 feet (110 m) deep, although the official measurement is uncertain. The lake is over 7 miles (11 km) long and averages 1 mile (1.6 km) in width, and is accessible via a solitary landing area located on the south end. The rest of the shoreline is inaccessible to vehicles, other than a few private properties.

Located approximately 30 miles (48 km) south of Cheney, Rock Lake is in a moderately remote location. Other towns in the area include Sprague, St. John, and Rosalia, although all are a number of miles away.

Rock Lake receives the majority of its water from Rock Creek, which further downstream is a tributary of the Palouse River, as well as Negro Creek. The lake is approximately 7 miles (11 km) long and 1-mile (1.6 km) wide, having a wildly varying depth with steep dropoffs plunging over 300 feet down. About half a mile from the boat launch, the lake's characteristic geography can be seen: high basalt cliff walls on either side with rock pillars and spires protruding from the bottom. The steep basalt cliffs and stone pinnacles which can rupture a hull and a lack of shoreline, coupled with the wind tunnel effect from the region's notable Palouse winds, have led to many deaths on the lake. In addition to the perils in the lake, its banks are also habitat for rattlesnakes in the spring and summer months.

== Recreation ==
The primary recreation activity on Rock Lake is fishing. Popular sport fishing species in the lake include: Crappie, Brown trout, Bluegill, and Rainbow trout.

Running along the eastern shore of the lake is the John Wayne Pioneer Trail, which is a converted rail trail. This section of trail is now open, completing open access from Idaho to North Bend, Washington with the addition of the rail bridge over the Columbia River near Vantage, Washington.

== Dam considerations ==
A dam was first considered at the mouth of Rock Lake in the late 1930s, and base columns were installed. The idea of a dam was abandoned at that point, because of the difficulty the topography would present.

Recently, interest in building a dam at this site has been renewed. Representatives of the Palouse-Rock Lake Conservation District are interested in having a dam built for the primary purpose of stabilizing water supply to right-holders below the dam by creating a consistent flow throughout the year. The current plans for a dam would impound 110,000-120,000 acre feet of water.
