= Mikhail Kamkin =

Russian footballer (born 1985)

Personal information
- Full name: Mikhail Sergeyevich Kamkin
- Date of birth: 11 August 1985 (age 41)
- Height: 1.72 m (5 ft 7 1/2 in)
- Position: Midfielder

Youth career
- FC Volgar Astrakhan

Senior career*
Years	Team	Apps	(Gls)
2002–2003	FC Volgar-Gazprom-2 Astrakhan (amateur)		
2003	FC Volgar-Gazprom Astrakhan	5	(0)
2004–2006	FC Sudostroitel Astrakhan	46	(2)
2008–2013	FC Astrakhan	106	(3)
- * Club domestic league appearances and goals

Mikhail Sergeyevich Kamkin (Russian: Михаил Серге́евич Камкин; born 11 August 1985) is a former Russian professional football player.

== Club career ==
He played in the Russian Football National League for FC Volgar-Gazprom Astrakhan in 2003.
