= Granville O. Haller =

Granville Owen Haller
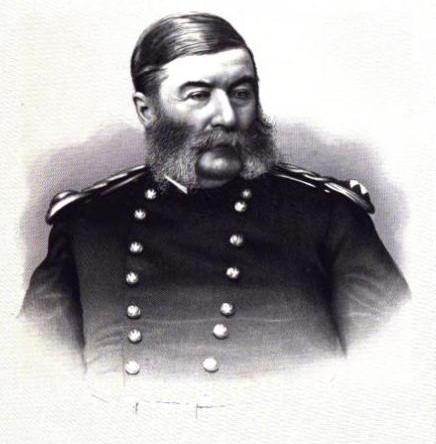
- Born: January 31, 1819; York, Pennsylvania, US
- Died: May 2, 1897 (aged 78); Seattle, Washington, US
- Burial place: Lake View Cemetery
- Military career
- Allegiance: United States
- Branch: United States Army; Union Army
- Service years: 1839–1863; 1879–1882
- Rank: Colonel
- Commands: 23rd U.S. Infantry
- Conflicts: Seminole Wars; Mexican–American War; Battle of Monterrey; Siege of Veracruz; Battle of Churubusco; Battle for Mexico City; Battle of Molino del Rey; Yakima War; Battle of Toppenish Creek; American Civil War; Peninsula Campaign; Maryland Campaign; Gettysburg campaign

Granville Owen Haller (January 31, 1819 – May 2, 1897) was a noted Indian fighter, United States Army officer, and wealthy post Civil War businessman who settled in northwest Washington state. During the American Civil War, he was charged with the defense of south-central Pennsylvania during the early days of Gettysburg campaign prior to the arrival of the Army of the Potomac.

== Early life and career ==
Haller was born and raised in York, Pennsylvania. After Haller graduated in 1838 from the York County Academy, the board of trustees recommended him for an appointment to the United States Military Academy. Not receiving Senator James Buchanan's appointment to West Point (which instead went to future Civil War general William B. Franklin), Haller responded to a summons to go to Washington, D.C., where he was commissioned as a lieutenant in the U.S. 4th Infantry Regiment.

Haller fought Seminole Indians in Florida in 1840–1841 and later served with distinction at Monterrey, Veracruz, and other battles during the Mexican–American War, officering in the same regiment as Ulysses S. Grant. He distinguished himself in the Battle of Churubusco, where he took a key part in the assault on Molino del Rey. In 1852, the Army promoted Haller to major and transferred him in 1853 to Washington Territory, stationed at Fort Dalles, Oregon with U.S. 4th Infantry units. He took part in the Northwest Indian wars of 1855-56 and the San Juan Islands' Pig War border crisis between the United States and Great Britain in 1859.

== Civil War and later career ==
After the Civil War started, Haller commanded George B. McClellan's headquarters guard during the Peninsula Campaign and again in the Maryland Campaign. In May 1863, he returned to his native York to recover from illness contracted in the field. In June, Maj. Gen. Darius N. Couch appointed Haller to command the defenses of Adams and York counties in south-central Pennsylvania. During the Gettysburg campaign, Haller retreated from Gettysburg to Wrightsville, Pennsylvania, where his militia and that of Col. Jacob G. Frick burned the Columbia-Wrightsville Bridge to prevent passage over the Susquehanna River by a Confederate brigade under John B. Gordon.

Accused by naval officer Lt. Clark Henry Wells of disloyal conduct and sentiments after the Battle of Fredericksburg, Haller was dismissed from the Army in July 1863. Wells alleged that Haller had toasted him "Here's to a Northern Confederation and a Southern one while Lincoln is President", blamed the President for casualties at Fredericksburg, and in a later dispute offered that a "Black Republican" would be a more suitable quarters-mate for him; Haller denied giving such a toast entirely, and protested that he did not blame the government for "disasters" at Fredericksburg but only the change in strategy caused by Lincoln's removal of General George B. McClellan. He and his wife eventually returned to the American West, settling on Whidbey Island in Coupeville, Washington Territory in 1866 where he built a home on Front Street and started a business that extended credit to pioneer families. In 1879, Haller's case of dismissal was re-examined by Congress. Following a six-day long court of inquiry in Washington, D.C., he was exonerated and his commission reinstated with a promotion to colonel.

Following the reinstatement, Haller accepted assignments to the Indian Territory in Oklahoma and sold his assets in Coupeville. After retiring from the Army in 1882, Haller returned to the Pacific Northwest and settled in Seattle where he built a three-story, eighteen-room mansion named "Castlemount" and became part of the growing city's business and industry community.

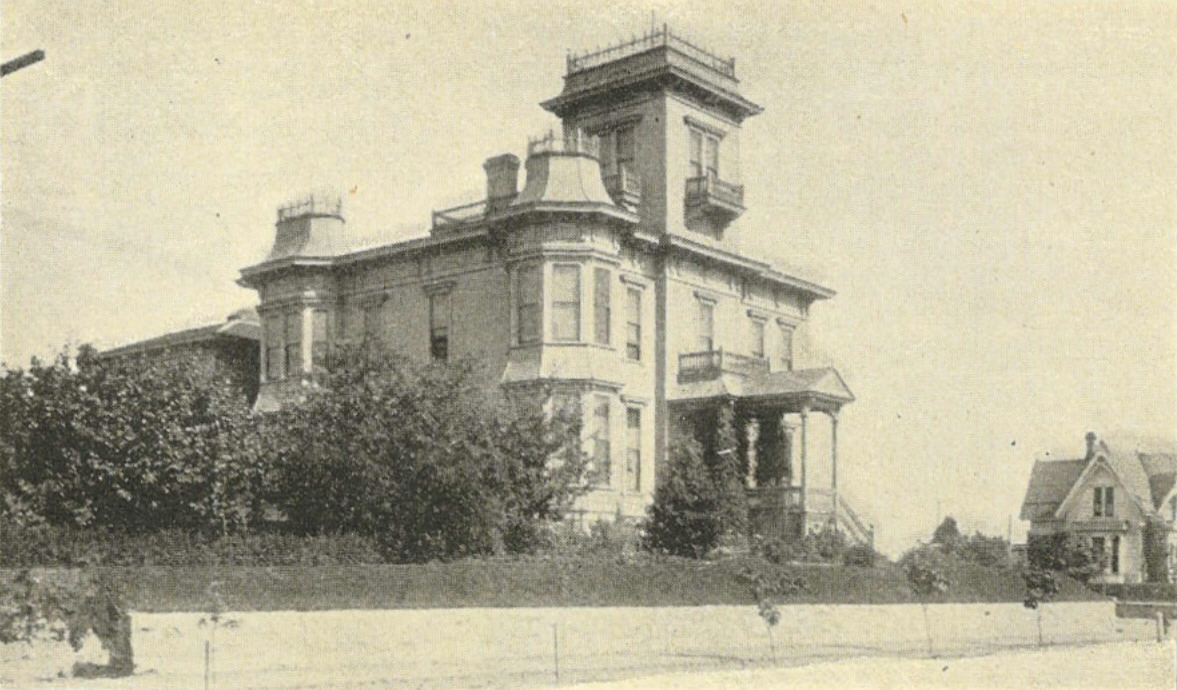
Haller's house on First Hill in Seattle (1900)

== Death and legacy ==
Haller died at the age of 78 and was buried in Seattle's Lake View Cemetery. His wife, Henrietta, died in 1910. Their son, Theodore, continued to live at Castlemount after the deaths of his parents but the mansion was eventually torn down along with the downtown Seattle Haller Building in the 1950s. Haller School in West Seattle had been donated by Haller's son, Morris, but later became a school annex and then American Legion Hall. Various other points of interest bearing Haller's name exist in the state of Washington: In Port Townsend, Washington, there is a Haller Fountain, on Whidbey Island there is a Haller Road, a Haller Street exists in both Coupeville and Arlington, Washington, and there is a Haller Lake in Seattle.

As of 2021, Haller's previously deteriorating home in Coupeville is being restored. The home, one of thirty other buildings on Whidbey Island left from the area's early settlement era dating between the 1850s and 1870s, has been the subject of a campaign by a local historic preservation group seeking to purchase and restore the house. The group, Historic Whidbey, with backing from the National Park Service, has plans to turn Haller House into a "Territorial Heritage Center".
