= Chief Kamiakin =

Yakama tribal leader

Kamiakin
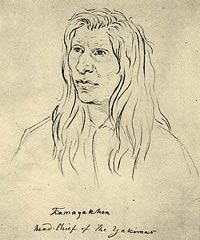
- Drawing by Gustav Sohon (1855). Credit: Washington State Historical Society
- Born: Kamiakin: "Star Chief" c. 1800 near Starbuck, Washington
- Died: 1877; Rock Lake, Washington
- Occupation: Hereditary Chief
- Known for: Leading resistance against encroaching settlers

Kamiakin (c. 1800–1877) (Yakama) was a leader of the Yakama, Palouse, and Klickitat peoples east of the Cascade Mountains in what is now southeastern Washington state. In 1855, he was disturbed by threats of the Territorial Governor, Isaac Stevens, against the tribes of the Columbia Plateau. After being forced to sign a treaty of land cessions, Kamiakin organized alliances with 14 other tribes and leaders, and led the Yakima War of 1855–1858.

Finally defeated, Kamiakin escaped to British Columbia and Montana. He returned to his traditional homeland in 1860. He moved to his father's former territory at Rock Lake in Whitman County, Washington in 1864, where he lived until his death.

== Early life ==
Kamiakin was of mixed Nez Perce, Spokane and Yakama ancestry. His father Ki-yi-yah was the son of a Nez Perce father and a Spokane mother. His mother was Yakama.

In 1825 Kamiakin married Sal-kow, also a Yakama, whose father Te-i-as and grandfather Weowikt were leaders in the tribe. Kamiakin later married Colestah, also a Yakama.

== Yakama War ==
In 1855 Isaac Stevens, the new Washington Territory governor, was anxious to extinguish claims to traditional lands by regional tribes and free up Native American land for sale to European Americans, who would develop it in recognized ways. He threatened leaders of several tribes to remove the Natives by force from the area east of the Cascades and bordering the Columbia River if they did not sell their lands. He thought that the most reasonable strategy was to gather many other tribes.

Kamiakin, a leader of the Yakama, began to organize immediately, allying with Peo-peo-mox-mox (Yellow Bird) of the Walla Walla and Allalimya Takanin (Looking Glass) of the Nez Perce. He eventually formed an alliance with a total of 14 tribes living on the Columbia plateau. The leaders agreed on wanting to resist encroachment by American settlers and government officials in the Washington Territory. The ensuing hostilities are referred to as the Yakima Indian War of 1855.

In 1855 Kamiakin convened a council in Eastern Oregon, with representatives from all of the tribes in the Grande Ronde Valley, in order to discuss how best to deal with the invaders and keep their lands. Governor Stevens learned of the meeting when Lawyer, a Nez Perce, informed him of the decisions made there. At the subsequent Walla Walla Council, when Kamiakin arrived, he noticed the large number of Nez Perce and U.S. Government officials, and realized his confidences had been betrayed. Stevens had used the information about the earlier meeting to marshal support for establishing reservations among the wavering tribal factions. When Oregon's Superintendent of Indian Affairs asked Kamiakin to speak, the proud Yakama refused. The other chiefs eventually pressured Kamiakin into signing the treaty "as an act of peace;" it established the Yakama reservation.

Kamiakin led a band of warriors into the first engagement of the war and on October 4 and 5, 1855, he defeated a force of 84 soldiers led by Major Haller near Simcoe Valley. Kamiakin was also instrumental in the final battle of the war. On September 5, 1858, Colonel George Wright, with a force of 700 soldiers, defeated Kamiakin and his warriors at the Battle of Four Lakes. Kamiakin was wounded in the battle when he was struck by a pine tree felled by cannon fire.

Colestah is reported to have saved her husband from capture by the U.S. soldiers. In the end, Kamiakin was the only leader who refused to surrender, escaping to Kootenai, British Columbia. From there he went to Montana, where he lived with the Flathead tribe.

== Final years ==
In 1860, Kamiakin returned to his home on the Palouse River. Following the death of Colestah in 1864, he moved to his father's homeland near Rock Lake (Washington) in Washington. Ranchers led by William Henderson repeatedly tried to drive Kamiakin from his ancestral lands, but Robert Milroy, superintendent of Indian Affairs, intervened. He followed through on his vow to allow Kamiakin to live out his days there. On at least two occasions, Kamiakin was offered food and clothing by local Indian agents, charity which he steadfastly refused.

The day before he died (sometime in 1877), Kamiakin was baptized a Catholic and given the name "Matthew." On the year anniversary of his death, according to his people's customs, his son (Tesh Palouse Ka-mi-akin) opened his father's grave and wrapped his remains in a new blanket. Several years later, when Kamiakin's body was exhumed in order to be reburied elsewhere, it was discovered that "the head and shoulders had been cut off and removed", probably for "public exhibition" as a curiosity." Historian Clifford Trafzer states that friends of Kamiakin were upset and retrieved these relics. In any case, what was left of his remains were interred at Nespelem, Washington, a village he had founded.

== Places named after Kamiakin ==
There are at least five schools in Washington state named for Kamiakin:

- Chief Kamiakin Elementary School in Sunnyside
- Kamiakin High School in Kennewick
- Kamiakin Junior High in Kirkland
- Kamiak High School in Mukilteo
- Kamiak Elementary in Pullman, Washington

In addition, Kamiak Butte and Kamiakin's Gardens are named for him. The latter is listed on the National Register of Historic Places.

Northeast Kamiaken Street - Pullman, WA
Kamiakin Trail - Fairchild AFB, WA
North Kamiakin Trail Lane - Colbert, WA
East Kamiakin Ave - Liberty Lake, WA
Kamiakin Road - Wapato, WA
Kamiakin Road - Ellensburg, WA

== See also ==
- Qualchan, nephew of Kamiakin
