= Klickitat people =

Klickitat
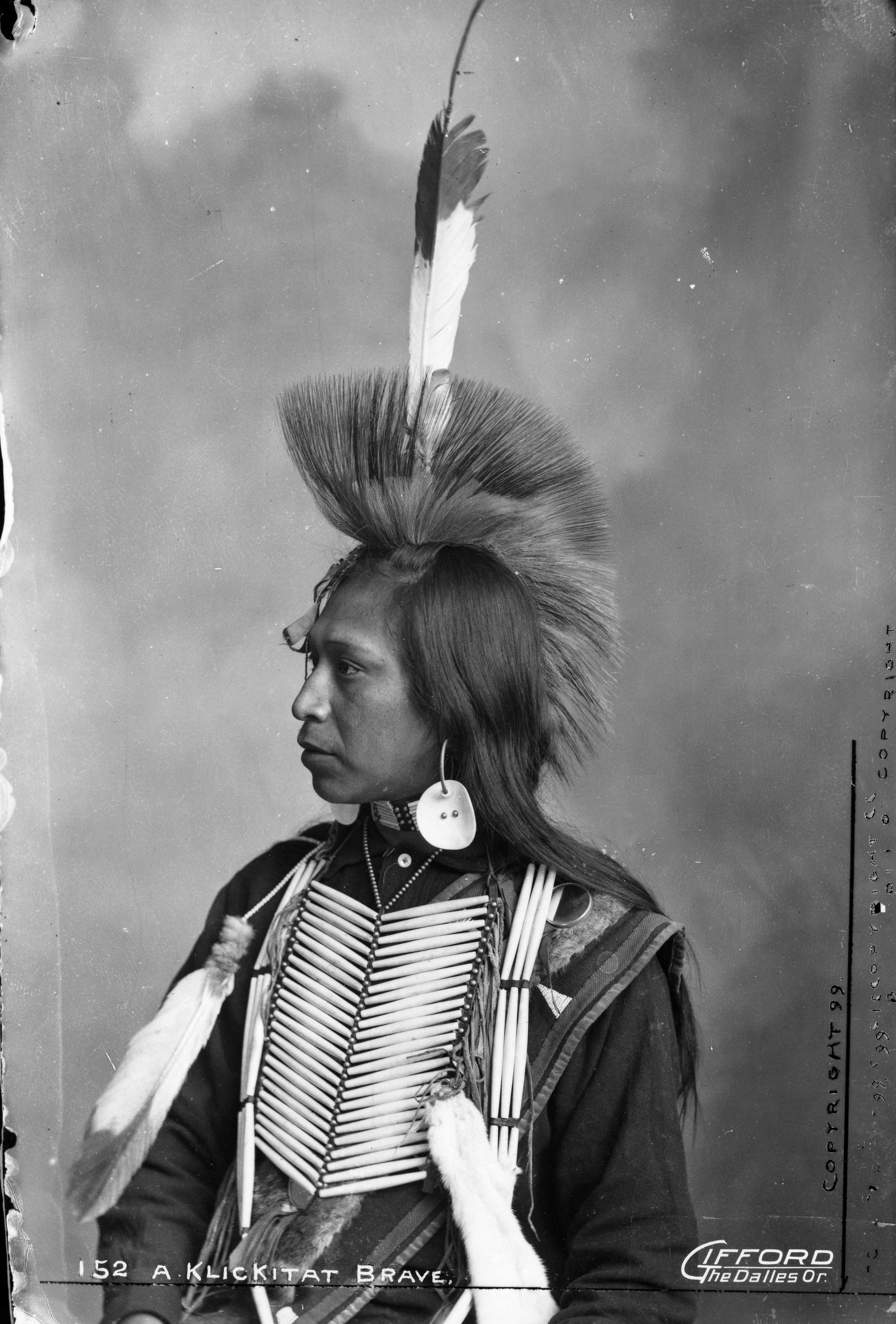
- A Klickitat warrior, 1899

Total population
- c. 600 in 1780; c. 400 in 1910

Regions with significant populations
- United States (Washington)

Languages
- English, Klickitat

Related ethnic groups
- Yakama

The Klickitat (also spelled Klikitat) are a Native American tribe of the Pacific Northwest. Today most Klickitat are enrolled in the federally recognized Confederated Tribes and Bands of the Yakama Nation; some are also part of the Confederated Tribes of the Grand Ronde Community of Oregon.

A Shahaptian tribe, their eastern neighbors were the Yakama, who speak a closely related language. Their western neighbors were various Salishan and Chinookan tribes. Their name has been perpetuated in Klickitat County, Washington, Klickitat, Washington, Klickitat Street in Portland, Oregon (also Big Lake, Minnesota), the former Washington State Ferry MV Klickitat, and the Klickitat River, a tributary of the Columbia River.

The Klickitat were noted for being active and enterprising traders, and served as intermediaries between the coastal tribes and those living east of the Cascade Mountains.

== Name ==
The ethnonym Klikitat is said to derive from a Chinookan word meaning "beyond," in reference to the Rocky Mountains. The Klickitat, however, call themselves Qwû'lh-hwai-pûm or χwálχwaypam, meaning "prairie people" (X̣ʷáɬx̣ʷaypam).

The Yakama called them Xwálxwaypam or L'ataxat. Other names for the Klickitat include:

- Awi-adshi, Molala name
- Lûk'-a-tatt, Puyallup name
- Máhane, Umpqua name
- Mǐ-Çlauq'-tcu-wûn'-ti, Alsea name, meaning "scalpers"
- Mûn-an'-né-qu' tûnnĕ, Naltunnetunne name, meaning "inland people"
- Tlakäï'tat, Okanagon name
- Tsĕ la'kayāt amím, Kalapuya name
- T!uwānxa-ikc, Clatsop name
- Wahnookt, Cowlitz name

== History ==
Klikitat woman.

The ancestral lands of the Klickitat were situated north of the Columbia River, at the headwaters of the Cowlitz, Lewis, White Salmon, and Klickitat rivers, in present-day Klickitat and Skamania Counties. They occupied their later base after the Yakama crossed this river. In 1805, the Klickitat were encountered by the Lewis and Clark Expedition. Lewis and Clark found them wintering on the Yakima and Klickitat Rivers and estimated their number at about 700.

In the early 1850s, the Klickitat Tribe raided present-day Jackson County, Oregon from the north and settled the area. Modoc, Shasta, Takelma, Latgawas, and Umpqua Indian tribes had already lived within the present boundaries of that county.

Between 1820 and 1830, an epidemic of fever struck the tribes of the Willamette Valley. The Klickitat took advantage of the drop in population in this region and crossed the Columbia River and occupied territory occupied by the Umpqua. This was not permanent, however, as they were pushed back to their original homeland.

The Klickitat War erupted in 1855. The Klickitat capitulated and joined in the Yakima treaty at Camp Stevens on June 9, 1855. They ceded their lands to the United States. Most of them settled upon the Yakama Indian Reservation, a minority on the Grand Ronde Community.

Despite accepting the un-ratified Treaty in 1855, the Kilkitats were reported to have surrounded the city during the Battle of Seattle on January 26, 1856.

The Klickitats were noted to trade salmon, roots, and berries and to have two chiefs within the tribe who welcomed Lewis and Clark in their arrival.

== Klickitat villages mentioned in historical sources ==
- Itkilak (Ithlkilak): at White Salmon Landing, occupied jointly with the Chilluckquittequaw Tribe.
- Nanshuit: occupied jointly with the Chilluckquittequaw Tribe, at Underwood.
- Shgwaliksh: not far below Memaloose Island.
- Tgasgutcu: occupied jointly with the Chilluckquittequaw Tribe, said to be about 34 miles west of long high mountain opposite Mosier, Oregon, and about 1 mile above White Salmon Landing but the exact location seems to be in doubt.
- Wiltkun: exact location unknown.

== Sources ==
- "Klikitat Indian History". accessgenealogy.com. 9 July 2011.
- "Washington Indian Tribes". Access Genealogy.
- "Klickitat". Encyclopedia of Native American Tribes (Third ed.). Archived from the original on March 3, 2016 – via fofweb.com.
