= Yakama =

Ethnic group

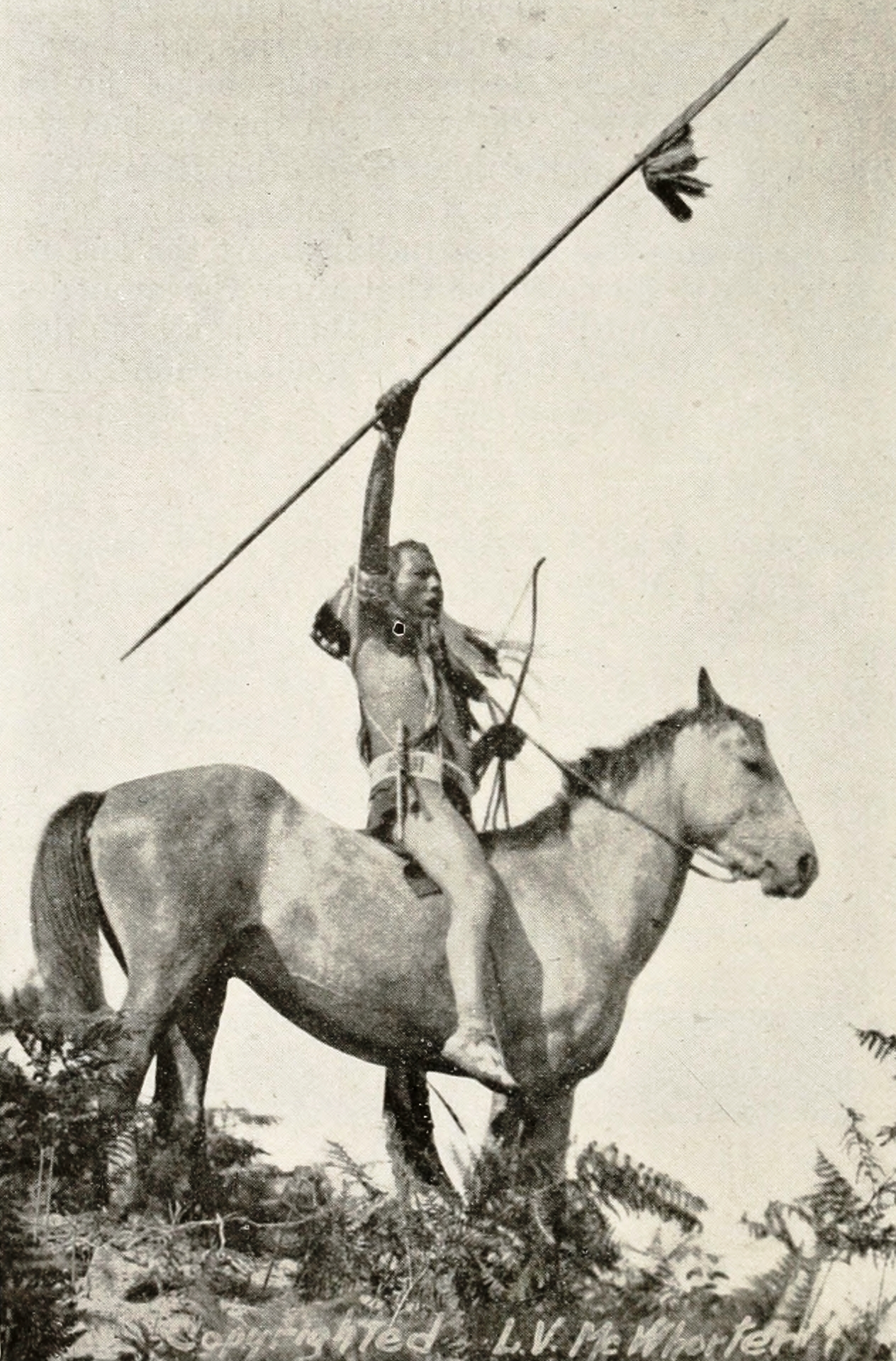
- Yakama warrior c. 1913, photographed by Lucullus V. McWhorter

Total population
- 10,851 (2000 Census)

Regions with significant populations
- United States (Washington)

Languages
- English, Ichishkíin Sínwit

Religion
- Christianity, Indian religions

Related ethnic groups
- Klickitat

The Yakama are a Native American tribe with nearly 10,851 members, based primarily in eastern Washington state.

Yakama people today are enrolled in the federally recognized tribe, the Confederated Tribes and Bands of the Yakama Nation. Their Yakama Indian Reservation, along the Yakima River, covers an area of approximately 1.2 million acres (5,260 km^{2}). Today the nation is governed by the Yakama Tribal Council, which consists of representatives of 14 tribes.

Their right to fish in their former territory is protected by treaties and was re-affirmed in late 20th-century court cases such as United States v. Washington (known as the Boldt Decision, 1974) and United States v. Oregon (Sohappy v. Smith, 1969), though more than a century of U.S. industrial pollution has contaminated these waterways with dangerous levels of toxic chemicals. The Columbia Basin Initiative aims to improve salmon-fishing for the tribe.

== Etymology ==
Scholars disagree on the origins of the name Yakama. The Sahaptin word E-yak-ma means "a growing family", and iyakima means "pregnant ones". Other scholars note the word yákama, which means "black bear," or ya-ki-ná, which means "runaway".

They have also been referred to as the Waptailnsim, "people of the narrow river," and Pa'kiut'lĕma, "people of the gap," which describes the tribe's location along the Yakima River. The Yakama identify as the Mamachatpam.

== Historic Yakama band and territories ==
″Yakima″ or ″Yakama″ was first a collective term for five (originally six) regional bands who spoke the same language or dialect of Sahaptin, also known as Ichishkíin Sɨ́nwit (″this language″). Usually they named the individual bands, village groups, local groups, and rivers after a specific rock formation, their main camps, or after an important village or fishing site.

The English names of the following local rivers were derived from Sahaptin: the Klickitat, Umatilla, Walla Walla, Palouse, Yakima, Satus, Toppenish, Tieton, and Wenatchee (in each case the original native term referred not to the river itself, which generally was left unnamed):

- Yakama (proper) or Lower Yakama (Autonym in Yakama: Mámachatpam) – Chief Kamiakin's people: Their territory encompasses the watershed of the Lower Yakima River east of the Cascade Range, hence they were called Lower Yakima to distinguish them from their upriver cousins – the ″Kittitas or Upper Yakama.″ As they were the largest group in population, they were often termed as Yakama or Yakama proper. Their lands stretched from Selah (″Quiet Water″) and Wenas just north of today's Yakima south to the area around today's Prosser (named for the nearby Prosser Falls as Tapteil, Tap tut, Toptut – ″rapids or falls″). All major rivers in this area – such as the Naches River, and Ahtanum, Toppenish and Satus reeks – are tributaries of the Yakima River.
  - Síla-ħlama (along the Yakima River between Wenas and Umtanum creeks, the northernmost Lower Yakama Band)
  - Wínas-ħlama (along Wenas Creek, the ″cross river″ between the Upper Yakama and Lower Yakama)
  - Nahchísh-ħlama (″People along the Roaring Water, i.e. Naches River″), lived along the Tieton and Naches rivers (the latter meaning ″roaring, rough or turbulent water″), the largest tributary of the Yakima River. They were closely linked to the Taitnapam (″People of the Tieton River″) regional band west of the Cascade Range)
  - Tkaíwaichaś-ħlama / Tkai'waichash-hlama (along Cowiche Creek near the eastern foothills of the Cascade Mountain range)
  - Átanŭm-ħlama (″People along Ahtanum Creek″, named after their territory along Ahtanum Creek, a right tributary to the Yakima River, entering the Yakima River immediately upstream of Ahtanum Ridge anticline (Union Gap), their main village Pa'kiut / Páxutakyuu-t ("both hills together or gap", "heads joined") in the valley between Ahtanum Ridge and Rattlesnake Ridge was the most important of the Lower Yakama; hence the self-designation of this particular local or village group as Pa'kiut'-ħlama / Pa'kiut'lĕma (″People of the gap″, lit. ″People of Mountain Heads Coming Together″) was transferred by the Europeans as Pah-quy-ti-koot-lema /Pakiutlema or as Narrow River Indians to all Lower Yakama bands and later to neighboring Yakama bands to)
  - Písko-ħlama / Pisko-pum (″Sagebrush People″, along Toppenish Creek of the Toppenish plains, a right tributary of the Yakima River)
  - Sí-ħlama (on Yakima River above the mouth of Toppenish Creek)
  - first Thápnĭś-ħlama / Thap-pah-nish (also on Toppenish Creek – Toppenish Creek was named after Tẋápniš / Txápni-sh (″that which suddenly goes forth″ or ″protruded, stuck out″, an allusion to a large landslide that occurred on the ridge south of White Swan, Washington – the contemporary Yakima Indian Reservation town of Toppenish is a corruption of this native term); this self-designation was transferred by the Europeans as Toppenish to refer to all Lower Yakama and neighboring Yakama bands)
  - second Thápnĭś-ħlama / Thap-pah-nish (on Toppenish Creek north of the Simcoe Mountains (in Yakama: Sim Quwe – "saddle back" or ″a dip between two hills like a saddle back″)
  - Símkoe-ħlama (along Simcoe Creek in the Simcoe Valley, later there was established Fort Simcoe, this area, originally known as "Mool-mool", had been a camp site for the summer and early fall seasons)
  - Se'tas-ħlama / Setass-lema (on Satus Creek)
  - Taptat-ħlama (″People at the rapids, i.e. Prosser Falls″, along Yakima River from the mouth of Satus Creek to present Kiona, with a key fishery at Prosser Falls (today: Prosser, in Yakama: Tapteil, Tap tut, Toptut – ″rapids, waterfalls″; this self-designation was also transferred by the Europeans as Tap-teil-lema / Tap-teil-min or its proper variant Waptail-lema / Waptailmim to all Lower Yakama and neighboring Yakama bands)
- Upper Yakama or Kittitas (meaning of the word Kittitas vary – perhaps ″shale rock, white chalk, or white clay ″, but in any case the name probably refers to the region's soil composition) (Note: Another interpretation is that the bread made from the root kous was called kit-tit. Kous grew in the Kittitas Valley. "Tash" is generally accepted to mean "place of existence.") (in Yakama: Pshwánwapam / Psch-wan-wap-pam / Pish-wana-pum – ″Many Rocks People″ or ″Stony Ground People″, also given as ″River Rock People″) – Chief Owhi's and Chief Qualchan's people: Their territory was usually north of Wenas Creek and Selah Creeks and along the Upper Yakima River, therefore they were called Upper Yakima in reference to the downriver living Yakama / Yakama proper (or Lower Yakama) bands. They occupied the northern Yakima River tributaries Cle Elum River (in Yakama: Tie-el-Lum – "swift water"), Teanaway River (in Yakama: Tyawnawí-ins – "[salmon] drying place"), Kachess River to the Wenatchee Mountains and Saddle Mountains in the east. Their territory included three large lakes in the Cascade Range (from east to west): Cle Elum Lake, Kachess Lake ("more fish") and Keechelus Lake ("few fish").
- Klikatat / Klickitat (a corruption of the place name látaxat for a key fishery at the falls of the Klickitat River or ládaxat, an Upper Chinook name for a Klickitat village with resident Kiksht-speaking Wishram, (Note: another version for the origin of the tribal name Klickitat is probably a Chinookan word meaning "beyond" in reference to the Rocky Mountains) in Yakama: Xwálχwaypam / Qwû'lh-hwai-pûm / X̣ʷáɬx̣ʷaypam – ″Prairie People″ or ″People of the village χwálχway (Steller's Jay')″, located at the junction of the Klickitat and Little Klickitat Rivers) – Chief Slockish's people: Their territory was generally situated north of the Columbia River, at the headwaters of the Cowlitz, Lewis, Washougal, White Salmon, and Klickitat rivers.
- Cowlitz Klickitat or Lewis River Klickitat Band, erroneously called Upper Cowlitz or Lewis River Cowlitz, sometimes Lewis River Chinook (in Yakama: Taitnapam / Taidnapam / Táitinpam – ″People of the Tieton River″): Closely allied with their Yakama kin (Áypaχ-pam – ″People of the Plains″ or ″People of the river mouth″) east of the Cascades – they had permanently occupied and controlled the Upper Cowlitz (shch'il) above Mossyrock, Cispus River (shíshpash), Tilton River (lalálx), the uppermost Nisqually River and Lewis River basins. They apparently intermarried with Salish-speaking Lower Cowlitz (in Yakama: T'lkwi'lipam / λ'kwílipam) communities downriver and travelled freely as far as the mouth of the Cowlitz River (in Yakama: shchil-aypáχ – ″Cowlitz River mouth″), as well as moving freely through adjacent Yakama-controlled territory east of the Cascade Crest. Their own name Taitnapam indicates that they originally came from east off the Cascades – along the Tieton River (in Yakama: Táitin) hence territory of the Nahchísh-ħlama, a Yakama/Lower Yakama band along the Naches River; they had strong linguistic and family ties to that band and to the Klikatat / Klickitat.
  - Qw':ltɫa'ma / Qwiilt-lá-ma (occupied the Mossyrock Prairie near Mossyrock on the east end of the Klickitat Prairie along Upper Cowlitz River)
  - Lalalxɫa'ma / Lalalx-lá-ma (their main settlement lalálx was at the mouth of the Tilton River, which was also called lalálx )
  - Wasaɫa'ma (lived around Morton at the foothills of the Cascade Mountains in the Tilton River Valley southwest of Mount Rainier)
  - Nucnu:ɫa'ma (lived in Cowlitz River Canyon)
  - Sw:ktsw'ktɫa'ma / Swikt-swikt-lá-ma (lived around today Nesika, Washington, on Riffe Lake, south of Morton and upriver of Mossyrock, and in Steel Canyon, Winters Mountain and Green Mountain)
  - K'wpɫa'ma (lived at the Cowlitz Falls of Cowlitz River, which was a key fishery site)
  - Cicpacɫa'ma (lived along Cispus River)
  - Qiyanxuɫa'ma / Q'iyanxw-lá-ma (lived along Cowlitz River, c. 7 miles west of Kiona, Washington)
  - Ca'q'kɫa'ma / Shíq'k-lá-ma (lived along Kiona Creek, a tributary of the Cowlitz River)
- Wanapum / Wánapam (″River People″): They lived south of the Saddle Mountains on both sides of the Columbia River downriver to the mouth of the Snake River, most important settlement as well as fishing grounds was at Priest Rapids, 1953 the construction of the Priest Rapids Dam and the Wanapum Dam flooded the Wánapam living and fishing grounds to create the Priest Rapids Lake reservoir. Today still about 60 Wánapam are living near today's Priest Rapids Dams. The Wanapam dreamer-prophet Smohalla (″Dreamer″ or ″Preacher″) was the most prominent leader of the Washane ("Dreamer Religion"), other prophets were Chief Homli (of the Walla Walla), Kotiakan (of the Pa'kiut'-ħlama local group of Lower Yakama) as well Lishwailait and Ashnithlai (both Klickitat). Adherents included Chief Joseph and his Nez Percé followers as well as Native people from other tribes in the region.
- Mishalpam (in Yakama: Mical-ɫa'ma – ″Eatonville people″, lit. ″Mashel River people″), later called Upper (Mountain) Nisqually, today also commonly known as Meshal / Me-Schal / Mashel / Mica'l Band of Nisqually – Chief Leschi's people: Their territory was generally on the west side of the Cascade Range and northwest of the kindred Klikatat / Klickitat and encompassed the Mashel River, tributary of the Nisqually, and the Upper Nisqually and Upper Puyallup River Valleys reaching up to Mount Rainier (Talol/Tacoma/Tahoma) ("bigger than Mount Baker") – together with Klikatat / Klickitat they occupied Ohop Valley in Pierce County (around present-day cities Eatonville and Roy); their primary village site was Basha'labsh on Meshal River, near present-day La Grande, Washington. They intermarried with downstream and closer to the coast living Southern Lushootseed-speaking Nisqually (Squalli-Absh / Sqʷaliʼabš) ("People of the Grassland"), a Coast Salish people, had switched from Sahaptin to Nisqually / Sqʷali'abš no later than in the 19th century. Chief Leschi (from Basha'labsh, with a Yakama mother) was one of the most important leaders during the Puget Sound War (1855 und 1856) of an intertribal alliance of Coast Salish (Nisqually, Puyallup (S'Puyalupubsh) and Muckleshoot) and Sahaptin (Mishalpam, Klikatat / Klickitat and Yakama) peoples.

Their lands lay within the Yakima Rivers (in Yakama: Tapteal – ″rapids″ because of the waterfalls at Prosser, Washington) watershed and for the most part east of the Cascade Range, to the south along the northern tributaries of the Columbia River (in Yakama: Nch'i-Wána – ″great river″) (here the Yakama bands frequently lived in bilingual villages together with Southern/Columbia River Sahaptin-speaking bands: Umatilla, Skin-pah/Skin, Tenino/Warm Springs), to the southwest along the Lower Snake River and Columbia River (here the Yakama bands lived also in bilingual villages together with Lower Snake River Sahaptin-speaking local groups of Chamnapam/Chem-na-pum, Wauyukma and Naxiyampam), to the northeast their tribal territories ranged up to the Wenatchee River (because of frequently intermarriages some of the originally Interior Salish-speaking Wenatchi bands switched to Sahaptin as first language), in the north to the lakes of Cle Elum Lake (after the Upper Yakama / Kittitas name Tie-el-Lum, meaning "swift water", referring to the Cle Elum River), Kachess Lake ("more fish") and Keechelus Lake ("few fish") at the headwaters of the Yakima River (with the directly northwest living Coast-Salish-speaking Snoqualmie the Yakama bands kept family ties), in the west across the Cascade Range to the headwaters of the Cowlitz River (shch'il), Lewis River ((wl'ɫt'kh) and White Salmon River (where there were also family ties with Coast-Salish-speaking Lower Cowlitz and Upper Chinookan/Kiksht-speaking Wasco-Wishram).

== History ==
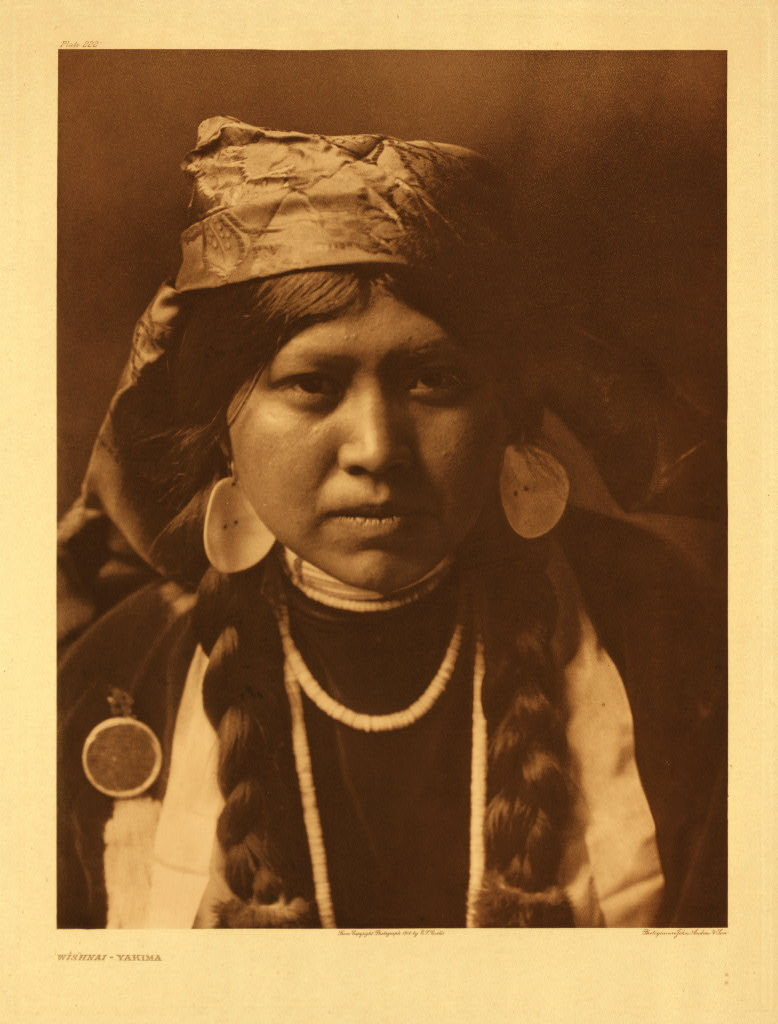
Yakama woman, c. 1911

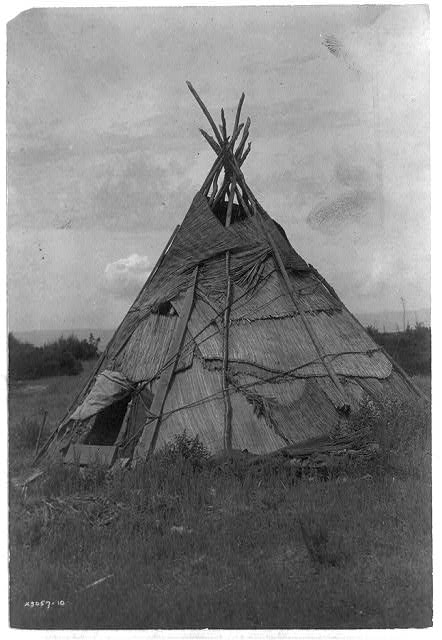
Yakama tipi, by Edward Curtis, 1910

The Yakama people are similar to the other native inhabitants of the Columbia River Plateau. They were hunters and gatherers well known for trading salmon harvested from annual runs in the Columbia River. In 1805 or 1806, they encountered the Lewis and Clark Expedition at the confluence of the Yakima River and Columbia River.

As a consequence of the Walla Walla Council and the Yakima War of 1855, the tribe was forced to cede much of their land and move onto their present reservation. The Treaty of 1855 identified the 14 confederated tribes and bands of the Yakama, including "Yakama (Lower Yakama or Yakama proper, autonym: Mámachatpam), Palouse (now written Palus, Yakama name: Pelúuspem), Pisquouse (P'squosa, now Wenatchi), Wenatshapam (Yakama name: Winátshapam, now Wenatchi), Klikatat (Yakama name: Xwálxwaypam or L'ataxat), Klinquit (a Yakama subtribe), Kow-was-say-ee (Yakama name: Kkáasu-i or K'kasawi, Tenino subtribe, today's Crow Butte, Washington, opposite of Boardman, Oregon), Li-ay-was (not identified), Skin-pah (Sk'in tribe or Sawpaw, also known as Fall Bridge and Rock Creek people or K'milláma, a Tenino subtribe; perhaps another Yakama name for the Umatilla, which were known as Rock Creek Indians), Wish-ham (Yakama name: Wíshχam, now Wishram, speaking Upper Chinook (Kiksht)), Shyiks (a Yakama subtribe), Ochechotes (Uchi'chol, a Tenino subtribe), Kah-milt-pay (Kahmiltpah, Q'míl-pa or Qamil'lma, perhaps a Klikatat subtribe), and Se-ap-cat (Si'apkat, perhaps a Kittitas (Upper Yakama) subtribe, Kittitas autonym: Pshwánapam or Psch-wan-wap-pams), confederated tribes and bands of Indians, occupying lands hereinafter bounded and described and lying in Washington Territory, who for the purposes of this treaty are to be considered as one nation, under the name 'Yakama'…". (Treaty with the Yakama, 1855) The name was changed from Yakima to Yakama in 1994 to reflect the native pronunciation.

== Language ==
Yakama is a northwestern dialect of Sahaptin, a Sahaptian language of the Plateau Penutian family. Since the late 20th century, some native speakers have argued to use the traditional Yakama name for this language, Ichishkíin Sínwit. The tribal Cultural Resources program wants to replace the word Sahaptin, which means "stranger in the land".

== Notable Yakama people ==
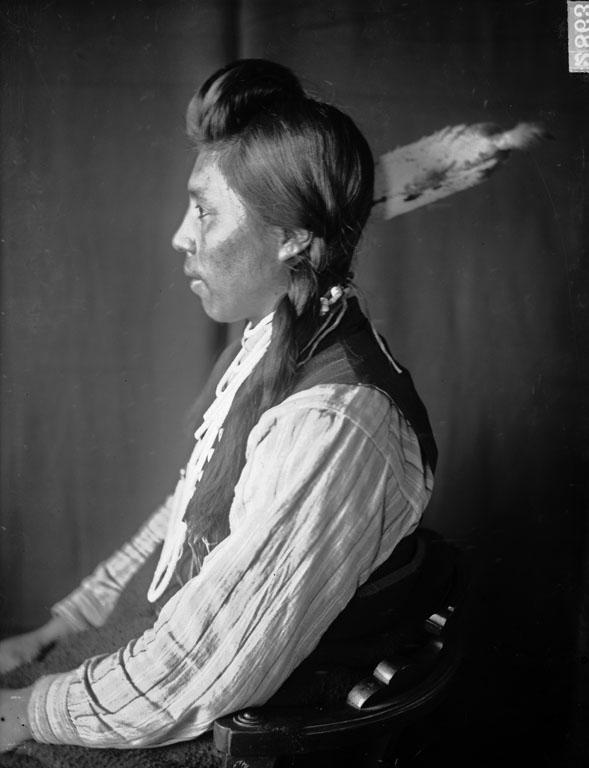
Profile of a Yakama man by DeLancey W. Gill, 1906.

- Ella Aquino
- Colestah
- Bunky Echo–Hawk
- Chief Kamiakin
- Lavina Washines
- William Yallup
- Russell Jim (Dr. Kiaux) Yakama Environmental Leader (1935-2018)
