= 92nd Air Refueling Squadron =

US Air Force unit

92nd Air Refueling Squadron

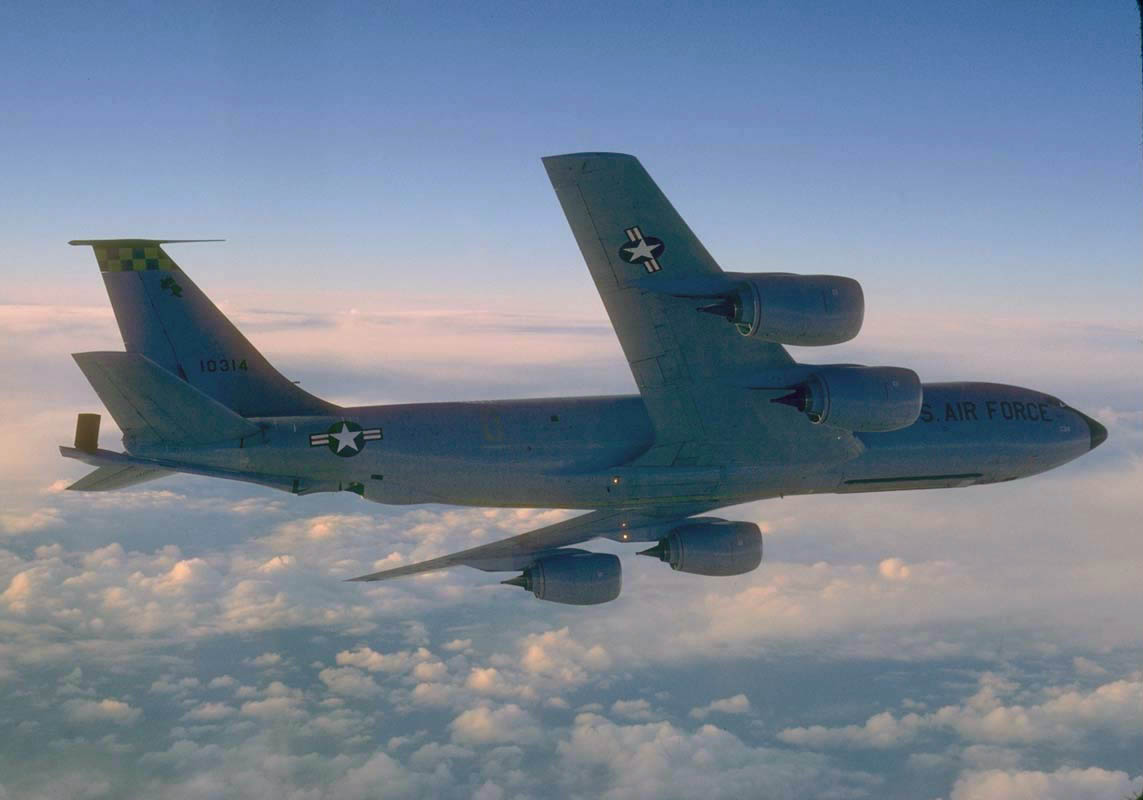
- KC-135 Stratotanker from Fairchild AFB
- Active: 1941–1945; 1957–present
- Country: United States
- Branch: United States Air Force
- Role: Aerial refueling
- Part of: Air Mobility Command
- Garrison/HQ: Fairchild Air Force Base
- Motto: Dantibus Damus (Latin for 'We Give So That You May Give')
- Engagements: Pacific Theater of Operations
- Decorations: Air Force Outstanding Unit Award with Combat V device Air Force Outstanding Unit Award; Republic of Vietnam Gallantry Cross with Palm

Insignia
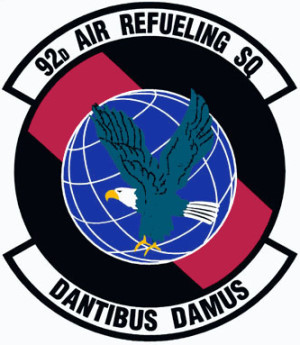
- 92nd Air Refueling Squadron emblem (Note: Approved 16 November 1994. Description: Sable, a bend Gules surmounted by a globe axis bendwise Azure gridlined and outlined Argent bearing an eagle Vert, head and tail White, beak and feet Yellow, all within a diminished bordure of the first [color].)

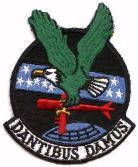
- Patch with early 92nd Air Refueling Squadron emblem (Note: Approved 6 April 1961.)

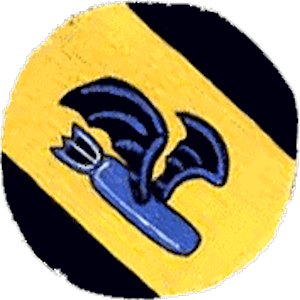
- 392nd Bombardment Squadron emblem (Note: Approved 19 January 1943. Description: On a black disc, border yellow, a bend of the second [color], charged with a blue aerial bomb, winged of black, falling to base.)

The 92nd Air Refueling Squadron, officially 92d Air Refueling Squadron, is a United States Air Force squadron of the 92nd Air Refueling Wing's 92nd Operations Group, stationed at Fairchild Air Force Base, Washington. It was first activated shortly before the entry of the United States into World War II as the 2nd Reconnaissance Squadron. After training in the Douglas B-18 Bolo in the southeastern United States, the squadron moved to the Pacific Coast after the Japanese attack on Pearl Harbor and participated in antisubmarine patrols with the Consolidated B-24 Liberator. In April 1942, it was redesignated the 392nd Bombardment Squadron. Starting in mid-1942, it also began training crews on the Liberator. It ended these operations in July 1943 and began to prepare for overseas movement. After three months of training, the squadron moved to the Central Pacific, where it flew its first combat mission in November. The 392nd continued combat operations until March 1945, when it was withdrawn and moved to Hawaii, where it conducted routine training and patrol operations until it was inactivated in November 1945.

In July 1957, the 92nd Air Refueling Squadron was established at Bergstrom Air Force Base, Texas by assuming the resources of the inactivating 506th Air Refueling Squadron when Strategic Air Command transferred its fighter units to Tactical Air Command. Three months later, the squadron moved to Fairchild Air Force Base, Washington, where it equipped with Boeing KC-135 Stratotankers, which it has flown for over fifty years. During the Cold War, the squadron maintained half its aircraft on alert. During the Cuban Missile Crisis, all the squadron's tankers were either on alert, deployed, or supporting Boeing B-52 Stratofortresses on airborne alert. The squadron also deployed aircraft to the Pacific to refuel strike aircraft during the Vietnam War.

In 1985, the 392nd Bombardment Squadron was consolidated with the 92nd Air Refueling Squadron. In 1992, the squadron ended its long association with Strategic Air Command and became part of Air Mobility Command. Since consolidation, the squadron has deployed personnel and aircraft to support most major United States operations, including combat and humanitarian support operations. Although it has not participated as a unit, squadron personnel and aircraft have deployed worldwide to support these operations. The squadron operates the Boeing KC-135 Stratotanker aircraft conducting worldwide air refueling missions.

== History ==
=== World War II ===
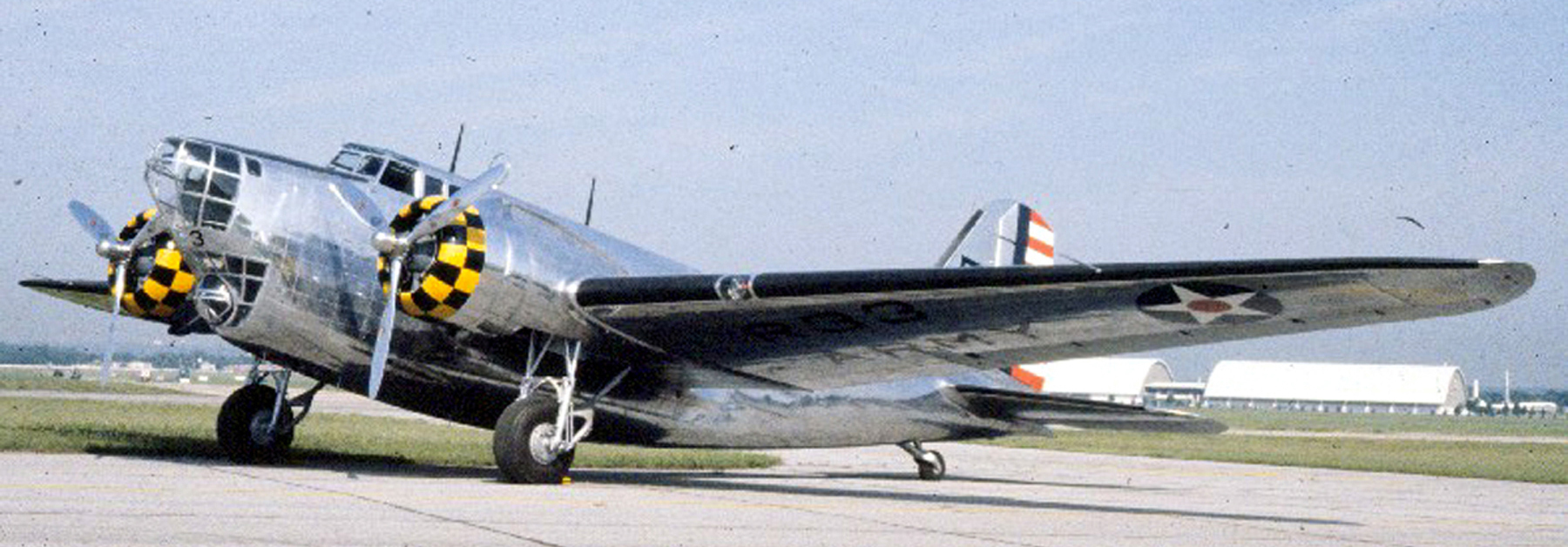
B-18 Bolo as flown by the 392d

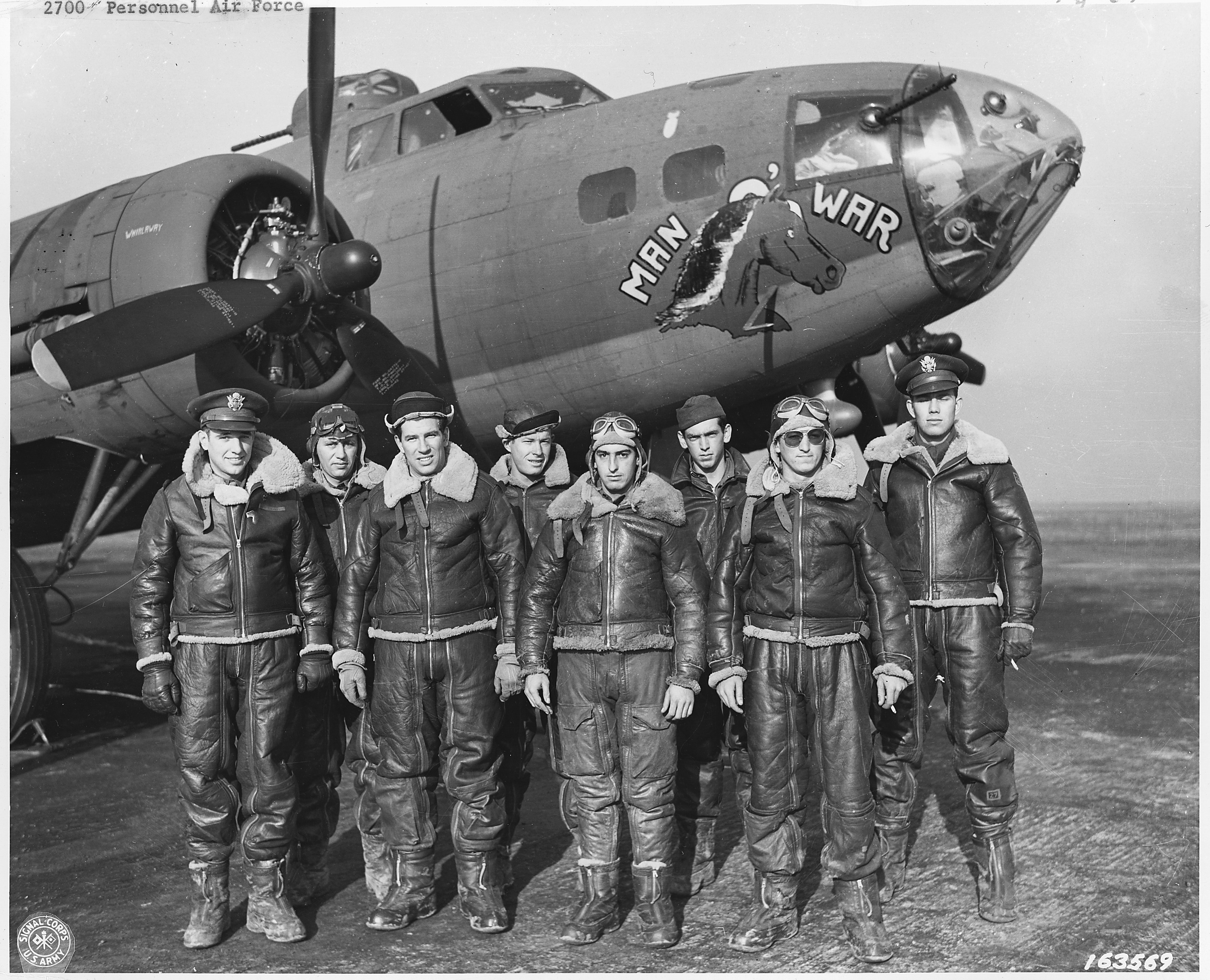
B-17 "Man o war"; of the 10 men crew two were KIA and eight POW

The squadron was first activated at March Field, California in January 1941 as the 2d Reconnaissance Squadron, and was attached to the 30th Bombardment Group per General Headquarters Air Force's policy of attaching one reconnaissance squadron to each bombardment group. Four months later it moved to New Orleans Airport, Louisiana, where it trained with the Douglas B-18 Bolo. Following the Japanese attack on Pearl Harbor, the squadron returned to California where it participated in antisubmarine patrols, re-equipping with Consolidated B-24 Liberators for operations. It was redesignated the 392d Bombardment Squadron in April 1942 and assigned directly to the 30th Bombardment Group. In June 1942, the unit added the mission of training aircrews in the B-24 and in the LB-30 Lend Lease version of the Liberator.

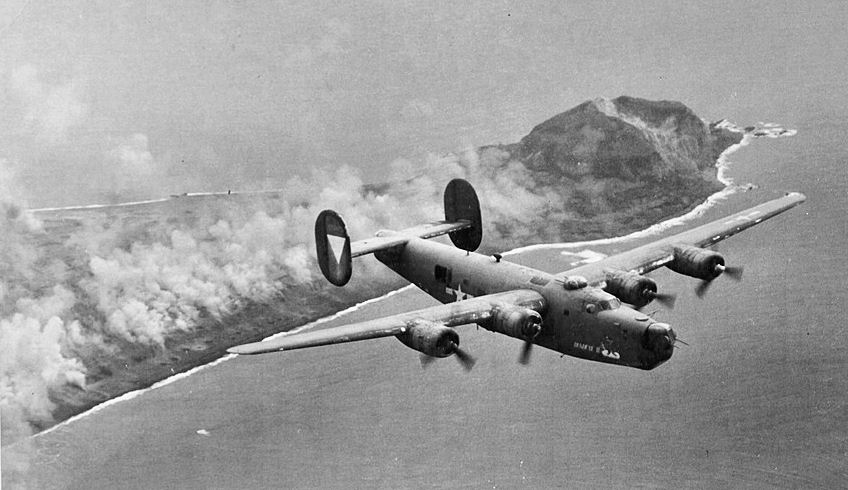
Squadron B-24J flying over Iwo Jima on 6 March 1945 (Note: Airplane is Consolidated B-24J-45-CO Liberator Serial 42-73425, nicknamed "Deadeye II".)

In July 1943, these operations ceased and the squadron began training to deploy to the Central Pacific, arriving in Hawaii in October 1943. It began combat operations from Canton Airfield in the Phoenix Islands in November 1943. From Canton, the squadron assisted in the invasion of the Gilbert Islands by attacking military installations on the islands and by raiding enemy airfields in the Marshall Islands to protect the amphibious assault on the Gilberts from attacks by Japanese aircraft stationed there.

The 392d "island hopped" to Abemama Airfield in the Gilberts, where it intensified bombing raids against Japanese installations in the Marshall Islands to help prevent the launching of Japanese planes against the amphibious assault on Tarawa. Staging through the recently captured Tarawa and Makin Islands, the squadron attacked several atolls in the Marshalls, including Kwajalein, between 14 November 1943 and 1 April 1944 and participated in the invasion of Kwajalein in February 1944.

As the war moved closer to Japan, the squadron attacked airfields and naval bases in the Truk Islands to neutralize forces there during invasions in the Mariana Islands. The 392d also bombed Wake Island, Guam, Saipan, and harassed other islands in the Carolines and Marianas bypassed by American amphibious forces.

In August 1944, the squadron moved to East Field (Saipan), in the Mariana Islands. During the next six months, the 392d conducted bombing strikes against airfields and shipping at Bonin and Volcano Islands, Iwo Jima, ChiChi Jima, and Yap. Its final bombing mission was at Iwo Jima on 19 February 1945, the same day three Marine divisions invaded the island.

In March 1945, the 392d withdrew from combat and returned to Hawaii, although some of its crews and planes remained in the combat zone, transferring to either of the other Liberator groups in theater, the 11th and 494th Bombardment Groups. Despite rumors that the group was to receive the Consolidated B-32 Dominator, the elements in Hawaii conducted training sorties and routine patrols with their Liberators until inactivating in November 1945.

=== Cold War ===
The 92d Air Refueling Squadron was activated on 1 July 1957 when it was partially manned by personnel of the inactivating 506th Air Refueling Squadron as Strategic Air Command transferred the 42d Air Division and its fighter resources at Bergstrom Air Force Base to Tactical Air Command. The squadron was assigned to the 92d Bombardment Wing, but was attached to Second Air Force as a non-operational unit until the middle of September 1957, when it moved on paper to Fairchild Air Force Base, Washington, where it acquired a few Boeing KB-29 Superfortress tankers, but became non-operational again in October. At Fairchild, the 92d Bombardment Wing was converting from Convair B-36 Peacemakers to Boeing B-52 Stratofortresses and the 92d began to equip with the Boeing KC-135 Stratotanker to support the B-52s in February 1958.

The squadron was declared combat ready in September 1958. In March 1959, the 92d flew its first mission supporting Operation Chrome Dome. Starting in 1960, one third of the squadron's aircraft were maintained on fifteen-minute alert, fully fueled and ready for combat to reduce vulnerability to a Soviet missile strike. This was increased to half the squadron's aircraft in 1962. The squadron maintained aircraft on alert except for periods when its forces were deployed until the end of the Cold War.

Soon after detection of Soviet missiles in Cuba in October 1962, Strategic Air Command (SAC) placed additional squadron KC-135s on alert to replace tankers devoted to maintaining 1/8 of SAC's B-52 bomber force on airborne alert. With the exception of aircraft deployed to support advanced Tanker Task Forces, all squadron aircraft went on alert on 24 October, as SAC assumed DEFCON 2. On 21 November, SAC returned to normal airborne alert posture. SAC finally returned to its normal alert posture on 27 November.

At various times between January 1970 and December 1975, detachments of the unit were organized at Mountain Home Air Force Base, Idaho and at Malmstrom and Glasgow Air Force Bases, Montana, where the 92d maintained part of its tanker alert force. From the 1980s through the termination of the task forces, the squadron deployed aircraft and crews to Tanker Task Forces in Panama, Alaska, Europe and he Pacific.

=== Vietnam War ===
As military operations in Vietnam escalated, the demand for air refueling of attacking aircraft increased. Crews from the squadron became actively involved in Operation Young Tiger starting in 1965, refueling combat aircraft in Southeast Asia (after 1966, it was joined by its sister at Fairchild, the 43d Air Refueling Squadron). Shortly thereafter, the mission of refueling B-52s participating in Operation Arc Light was added. The 92d furnished tankers and crews to support combat in Southeast Asia until 1975.

In 1985, the 392d Bombardment Squadron was consolidated with the 92d Air Refueling Squadron into a single unit, retaining the refueling squadron designation.

=== Desert Storm and the 1990s ===
Following Iraq's invasion of Kuwait on 15 August 1990, the squadron deployed personnel for Operation Desert Shield. Operating until April 1991 to support Desert Shield and Operation Desert Storm, the squadron personnel, along with those of the 43d Air Refueling Squadron, flew a combined total of 4,004 hours, 721 sorties, and off-loaded 22.5 million pounds of fuel to coalition aircraft.

In June 1992, as a result of an Air Force reorganization, the squadron was temporarily separated from its parent of 35 years, when SAC's forces were split between Air Combat Command (ACC) and Air Mobility Command (AMC). While the 92d Wing became part of ACC, the squadron was reassigned to AMC's 453rd Operations Group, which was activated at Fairchild to command AMC refueling forces there. Two years later, the 92d retired its B-52s and became the 92d Air Refueling Wing of AMC. The 453d was inactivated and the squadron was reunited with the 92d.

Since 1994, the unit has been involved in virtually every contingency, whether combat or humanitarian relief missions. In addition, its KC-135s have routinely supported special airlift missions. Throughout much of the 1990s, the unit was involved in missions in Southwest Asia. Squadron personnel participated in Operation Desert Strike, the 1996 cruise missile attacks on Iraq, and Operation Phoenix Scorpion, the positioning of a rapid deployment force to prepare for coercive strikes if needed when Iraq acted to stop United Nations (UN) weapons inspections. It routinely deployed in support of Operations Southern and Northern Watch, which required a constant presence of tankers and personnel to enforce the UN-sanctioned no-fly zones in Iraq. The unit also deployed aircraft and personnel in 1999 to support Operation Allied Force, the North Atlantic Treaty Organization strikes against Serb forces in the Kosovo War.

=== Operation Enduring Freedom ===
Following the terrorist attacks on 9/11, the squadron began providing around-the-clock air refueling of combat air patrol fighter aircraft and began to maintain ground alert operations in support of Operation Noble Eagle, the expansion of security forces to defend the United States from potential terrorist attacks. Preparations also began for what would become a series of extended Operation Enduring Freedom deployments as well as Operation New Dawn, operations in Iraq after August 2010.

On 1 October 2007, the 141st Air Refueling Wing became an associate unit of the 92d wing and its 116th Air Refueling Squadron began flying the same aircraft as the 92d squadron and the other flying squadrons of the wing.

For ten months during 2011, the squadron relocated its operations to Grant County International Airport and Spokane International Airport (Note: Both of these airfields were former Air Force installations, Larson Air Force Base and Geiger Field.)c while the Fairchild runway reconstruction project was taking place. Despite significant surge operations throughout the year, the unit was able to support all of its major taskings from the split locations.

On 25 February 2014, the unit aircraft and aircrews returned from the Transit Center at Manas, Kyrgyzstan, for the last time. Deployments to Manas had begun in 2005.

== Lineage ==
392d Bombardment Squadron

- Constituted as the 2nd Reconnaissance Squadron (Heavy) on 20 November 1940

Activated on 15 January 1941

- Redesignated: 392d Bombardment Squadron (Heavy) on 22 April 1942
- Redesignated: 392d Bombardment Squadron, Heavy on 5 May 1943

Inactivated on 30 November 1945

- Consolidated with the 92d Air Refueling Squadron as the 92d Air Refueling Squadron on 19 September 1985

92d Air Refueling Squadron

- Constituted as the 92d Air Refueling Squadron, Heavy on 12 February 1957

Activated on 1 July 1957

- Consolidated with the 392d Bombardment Squadron on 19 September 1985

Redesignated 92d Air Refueling Squadron on 1 September 1991

=== Assignments ===
- General Headquarters Air Force, 15 January 1941 (attached to 30th Bombardment Group)
- III Bomber Command, 4 September 1941 (remained attached to 30th Bombardment Group)
- 30th Bombardment Group, 22 April 1942 – 30 November 1945
- 92d Bombardment Wing (later 92d Strategic Aerospace Wing, 92d Bombardment Wing), 1 July 1957 (attached to Second Air Force, 1 July – 13 September 1957)
- 92d Operations Group, 1 September 1991
- 453rd Operations Group, 1 June 1992
- 92d Operations Group, 1 July 1994 – present

=== Stations ===
- March Field, California, 15 January 1941
- New Orleans Airport, Louisiana, 5 May 1941
- Muroc Army Air Field, California, 25 December 1941
- Hammer Field, California, 27 February 1942

Detachment operated from San Diego Airport, California, 10 April – 11 May 1942

- March Field, California, 15 July 1942 – 28 September 1943
- Barking Sands Army Air Field, Hawaii, 20 October 1943
- Canton Airfield, Phoenix Islands, 10 November 1943
- Abemama Airfield, Gilbert Islands, 10 January 1944
- Kwajalein Airfield, Marshall Islands, 17 March 1944
- East Field (Saipan), Mariana Islands, 4 August 1944
- Kipapa Airfield, Hawaii Territory, 18 March 1945
- Kahuku Field, Hawaii Territory, 29 September – 30 November 1945
- Bergstrom Air Force Base, Texas, 1 July 1957
- Fairchild Air Force Base, Washington, 14 September 1957 – present

=== Aircraft ===
- Douglas B-18 Bolo (1941)
- Boeing B-17 Flying Fortress (1941)
- Consolidated LB-30 (1942)
- Consolidated B-24 Liberator (1943–1945)
- Boeing KB-29 Superfortress (1957)
- Boeing KC-135 Stratotanker (1958–present)

=== Awards and campaigns ===
Award streamer	Award	Dates	Notes
	Air Force Outstanding Unit Award w/Combat "V" Device	2 March 1969 – 30 September 1969	92d Air Refueling Squadron
	Air Force Outstanding Unit Award	3 March 1959 – 6 October 1959	92d Air Refueling Squadron
	Air Force Outstanding Unit Award	1 January 1961 – 31 March 1962	s92d Air Refueling Squadron
	Air Force Outstanding Unit Award	1 July 1967 – 30 June 1968	92d Air Refueling Squadron
	Air Force Outstanding Unit Award	1 July 1968 – 1 October 1968	92d Air Refueling Squadron
	Air Force Outstanding Unit Award	1 July 1969 – 30 June 1970	92d Air Refueling Squadron
	Air Force Outstanding Unit Award	1 July 1976 – 30 June 1977	92d Air Refueling Squadron
	Air Force Outstanding Unit Award	1 July 1987 – 30 June 1989	92d Air Refueling Squadron
	Air Force Outstanding Unit Award	1 June 2001–31 May 2003	92d Air Refueling Squadron
	Air Force Outstanding Unit Award	1 June 2003 – 31 Dec 2005	92d Air Refueling Squadron
	Air Force Outstanding Unit Award	1 January 2006 – 31 August 2007	92d Air Refueling Squadron
	Air Force Outstanding Unit Award	1 September 2007 – 31 August 2008	92d Air Refueling Squadron
	Vietnamese Gallantry Cross with Palm	2 March 1969 – 30 September 1969	92d Air Refueling Squadron

Campaign Streamer	Campaign	Dates	Notes
	Antisubmarine	7 December 1941 – June 1943	2d Reconnaissance Squadron (later 392d Bombardment Squadron)
	Central Pacific	20 October 1943 – 6 December 1943	392d Bombardment Squadron
	Air Offensive, Japan	20 October 1943 – 2 September 1945	392d Bombardment Squadron
	Western Pacific	17 April 1944 – 18 March 1945	392d Bombardment Squadron
	Eastern Mandates	7 December 1943 – 14 April 1944	392d Bombardment Squadron

== See also ==
- List of United States Air Force air refueling squadrons
- B-24 Liberator units of the United States Army Air Forces
- List of B-29 Superfortress operators
