= 506th Expeditionary Air Refueling Squadron =

506th Expeditionary Air Refueling Squadron

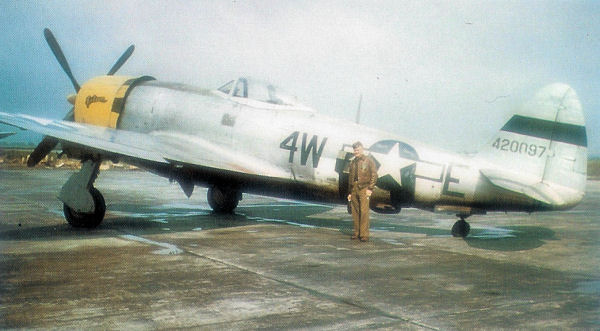
- Republic P-47D Thunderbolt 44-200097 of the 406th Fighter Squadron at Furth/Industriehafen
- Active: 1943–1945; 1953–1957; c. 2018–unknown
- Country: United States
- Branch: United States Air Force
- Role: Air Refueling
- Part of: Pacific Air Forces
- Motto: Any Time Any Where
- Colors: Yellow (World War II)
- Engagements: European Theater of Operations
- Decorations: Distinguished Unit Citation

Insignia
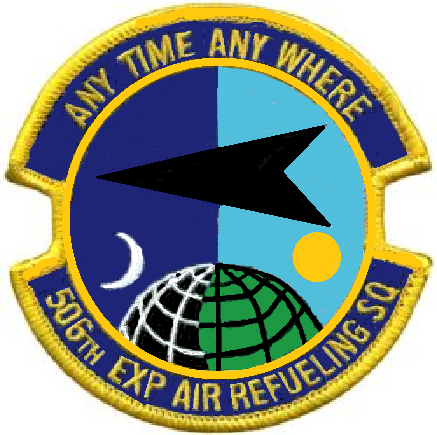
- 506th Expeditionary Air Refueling Squadron emblem

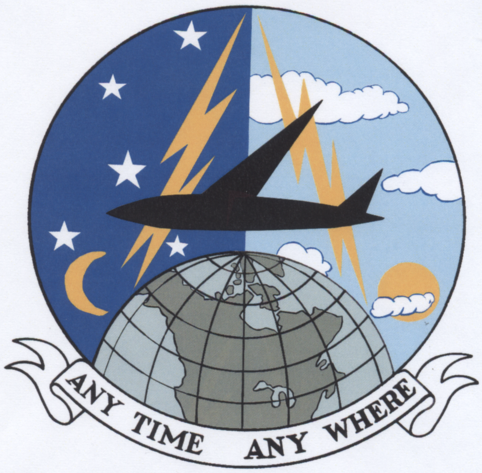
- 506th Air Refueling Squadron emblem
- World War II fuselage code: 4W

The 506th Expeditionary Air Refueling Squadron is a provisional United States Air Force unit, assigned to Air Mobility Command to activate or inactivate as needed. Most recently, it has been active at Andersen Air Force Base, Guam as the operational unit for deployed air refueling units. It was last active as a regular unit at Bergstrom Air Force Base, Texas where it was inactivated on 1 July 1957 and its personnel and equipment transferred to another squadron.

The squadron was first activated as the 406th Fighter Squadron in 1943, one of the original squadrons of the 371st Fighter Group. The squadron saw combat in the European Theater of Operations before being inactivated in 1945, earning a Distinguished Unit Citation for its attacks in March 1945 that contributed to the defeat of Axis forces in southern Germany.

The 506th Air Refueling Squadron was established in 1953 by Strategic Air Command (SAC) at Dow Air Force Base, Maine and equipped with rigid flying boom KB-29P Superfortress tankers. The squadron mission was to provide air refueling for its parent wing and other USAF units. It moved to Bergstrom Air Force Base, Texas in 1955 and was inactivated there in July 1957 when SAC transferred its fighter force to Tactical Air Command.

== History ==
=== World War II ===
The 406th Fighter Squadron was activated at Richmond Army Air Base, Virginia in the summer of 1943 as one of the three original squadrons of the 371st Fighter Group. The squadron trained in the northeastern United States with Republic P-47 Thunderbolts under First Air Force before moving overseas in the spring of 1944.

Upon arriving in England, the squadron became an element of Ninth Air Force at Bisterne Close, England. The squadron's first combat operation was a fighter sweep over Occupied France. Prior to Operation Overlord, the invasion of Normandy, the 406th flew fighter sweeps, dive bombing and escort missions.

On D-Day the 406th patrolled the beachhead. attacking railroads, trains, vehicles. gun emplacements and other targets. Soon after the invasion, the squadron moved to France and participated in the air interdiction that preceded the Allied breakout at St Lo in late July and supported the following drive across northern France. It continued to operate in northeastern France and southwestern Germany through the winter of 1945, attacking storage dumps, marshalling yard, factories, bridges, roads, and vehicles. In December 1944 it provided close air support for ground forces engaged in the Battle of the Bulge.

The squadron was awarded a Distinguished Unit Citation for its attacks between 15 and 21 March 1945 that contributed to the defeat of Axis forces in southern Germany. It continued combat operations until the Surrender of Germany in May. The squadron remained with the occupation forces in Germany until October 1945 when it returned to the United States and was inactivated.

=== Cold War ===
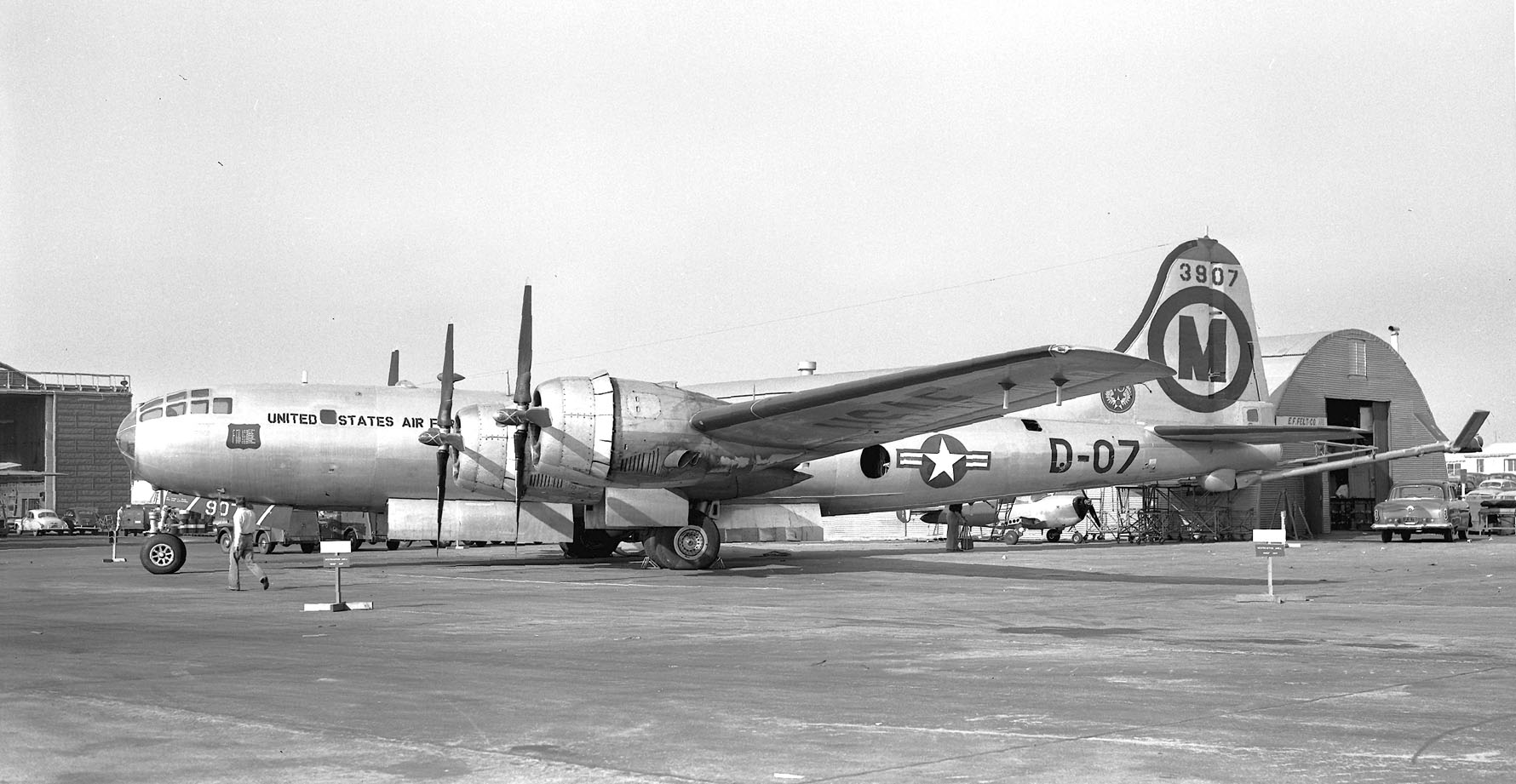
Boeing KB-29P as flown by the squadron

The 506th Air Refueling Squadron was established on 25 September 1953 by Strategic Air Command (SAC) at Dow Air Force Base and initially equipped with rigid flying boom Boeing KB-29P Superfortress tankers. Its mission was to provide air refueling to the Republic F-84 Thunderjet strategic fighters of its parent wing. The squadron also supported other USAF units as directed. In 1954 the squadron deployed to Kindley Air Force Base, Bermuda to support SAC fighters of the 508th Strategic Fighter Wing.

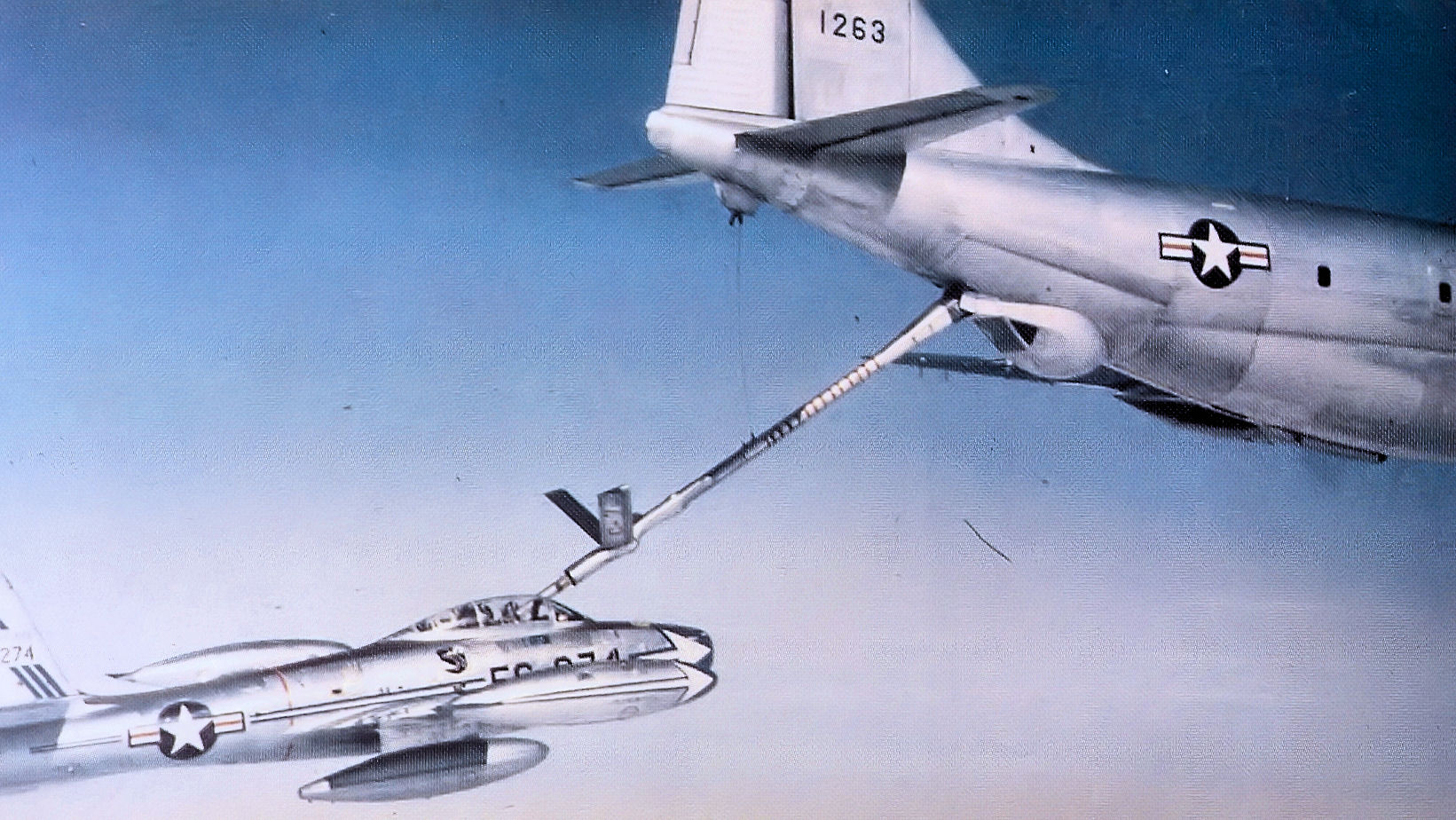
KC-97 refueling a SAC F-84G Thunderjet

In 1955 SAC concentrated its strategic fighter units, and the 506th's parent 506th Strategic Fighter Wing moved to Tinker Air Force Base, Oklahoma in March. The squadron remained at Dow and was reassigned to the 4060th Air Refueling Wing until August, when it moved to Bergstrom Air Force Base, Texas, where it was assigned to the 42d Air Division, the parent of the 12th Strategic Fighter Wing, to which the squadron was attached.

The 506th was inactivated at Bergstrom on 1 July 1957 and its mission, personnel, and equipment were transferred to the 92d Air Refueling Squadron, which was activated that same day to assume SAC resources at Bergstrom as the 42d Air Division and SAC fighter organizations were transferred to Tactical Air Command.

The 406th Fighter Squadron and the 506th Air Refueling Squadron were consolidated in 1985, but the consolidated unit has not been active.

=== Expeditionary unit ===
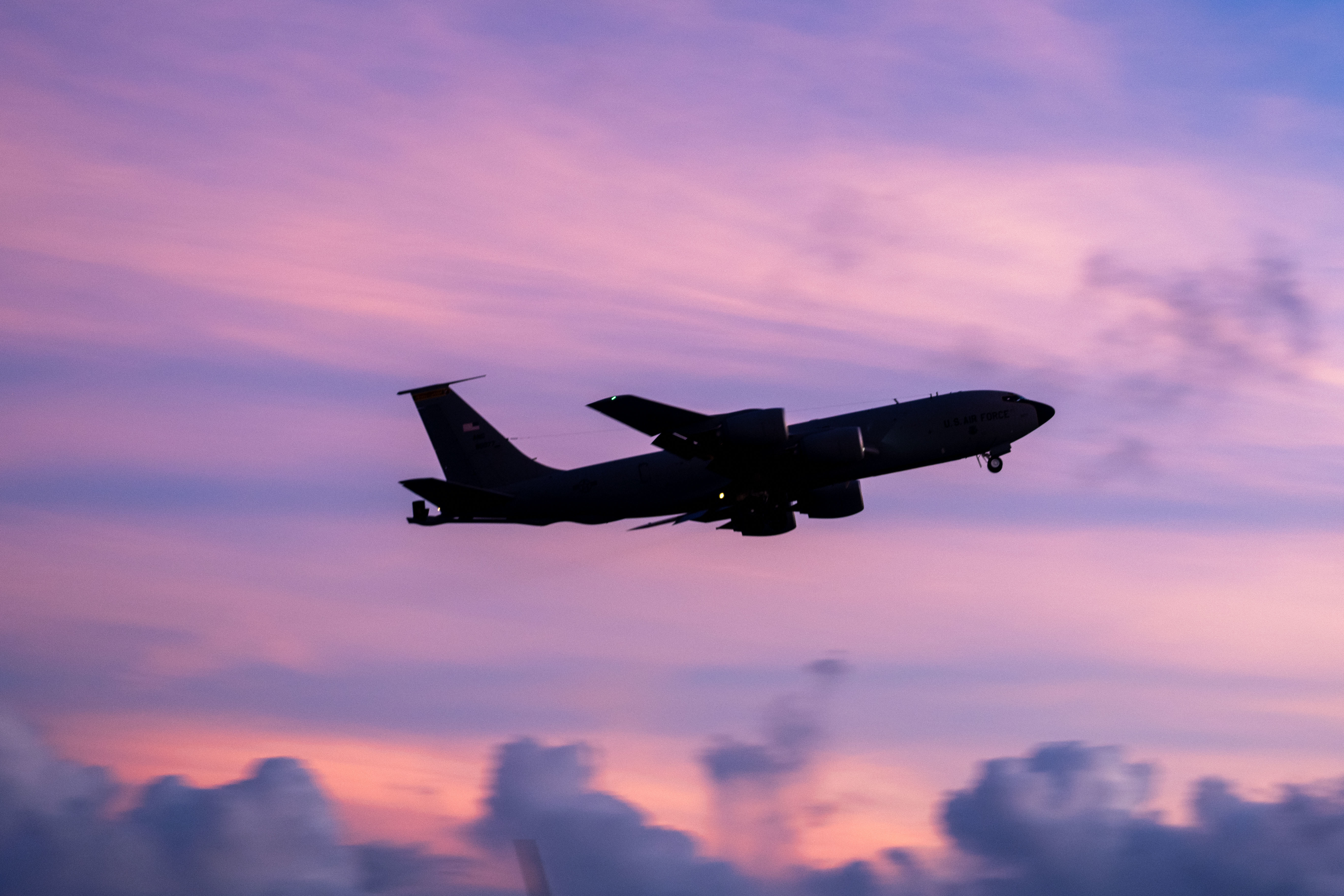
A KC-135 Stratotanker departs from Andersen AFB

In June 2002, the squadron was converted to provisional status as the 506th Expeditionary Air Refueling Squadron and assigned to Air Mobility Command to activate or inactivate as needed. The squadron is known to have been active at Andersen Air Force Base since at least October 2007. The unit is made up of regular, Air National Guard and Air Force Reserve units that rotate every 90 days. In December 2022, members of the Wisconsin Air National Guard's 128th Air Refueling Wing deployed along with other units to support the continuous bomber task force at Andersen and other packages deployed to the Pacific. Members of the 168th Air Refueling Wing from the Alaska Air National Guard have also deployed to the squadron. (Note: The cited source says the 168th Wing deployment will end in October, but fails to supply a year.)

== Lineage ==
406th Fighter Squadron

Constituted as the 406th Fighter Squadron, Single Engine on 15 May 1943
Activated on 15 July 1943
Inactivated on 10 November 1945

- Consolidated on 19 September 1985 with the 506th Air Refueling Squadron as the 506th Air Refueling Squadron

506th Air Refueling Squadron

Constituted as the 506th Air Refueling Squadron, Medium and activated on 25 September 1953
Inactivated on 1 July 1957
Consolidated on 19 September 1985 with the 406th Fighter Squadron as the 506th Air Refueling Squadron, Heavy (remained inactive)
Redesignated 506th Expeditionary Air Refueling Squadron and converted to provisional status on 12 June 2002
Active by October 2007 – through June 2025

=== Assignments ===
- 371st Fighter Group: 15 July 1943 – 10 November 1945
- 506th Strategic Fighter Wing: 25 September 1953
- 4060th Air Refueling Wing: 1 March 1955
- 42d Air Division: 15 August 1955 – 1 July 1957 (attached to 12th Strategic Fighter Wing)
- Air Mobility Command to activate or inactivate as needed, 12 June 2002
- Attached to 36th Operations Group, by October 2007 – through June 2025

=== Stations ===
- Richmond Army Air Base, Virginia, 15 July 1943
- Camp Springs Army Air Field, 2 October 1943
- Millville Army Air Field, 17 November 1943
- Camp Springs Army Air Field, 12 December 1943
- Richmond Army Air Base, Virginia, 20 January 1944 – 14 February 1944
- Bisterne Close, England, (Station 415), 7 March 1944
- Beuzeville Airfield, France (A-6), c. 17 June 1944
- Perthes Airfield, France (A-65), c. 20 September 1944
- Dôle-Tavaux Airfield, France (Y-7), 1 October 1944
- Tantonville Airfield, France (Y-1), 29 December 1944
- Metz-Frescaty Airfield, France (Y-34), 15 February 1945
- Frankfurt-Eschborn Airfield, Germany (Y-74), c. 3 May 1945
- Fürth-Atzendorf Airfield, Germany (R-28), c. 5 April 1945
- Hörsching Airfield, Austria (R-87), 16 August 1945
- Stuttgart, Germany, c. 13 September 1945 – October 1945
- Camp Shanks, New York, 9 November 1945 – 10 November 1945
- Dow Air Force Base, Maine 25 September 1953
- Bergstrom Air Force Base, Texas, 15 August 1955 – 1 July 1957
- Andersen Air Force Base, Guam, by October 2007 – through June 2025

=== Aircraft ===
- Republic P-47 Thunderbolt, 1943–1945
- Boeing KB-29 Superfortress, 1953-unknown
- Boeing KC-97 Stratotanker, unknown-1957
- Boeing KC-135 Stratotanker, by October 2007 – through June 2025

=== Awards and campaigns ===
Award streamer	Award	Dates	Notes
	Distinguished Unit Citation	15 March 1945–21 March 1945	406th Fighter Squadron, Germany
	Air Force Outstanding Unit Award	1 October 2007–30 September 2008	506th Expeditionary Air Refueling Squadron
	Air Force Outstanding Unit Award	1 October 2008–30 September 2009	506th Expeditionary Air Refueling Squadron

- 406th Fighter Squadron cited in the Order of the Day, Belgian Army for the period 6 June 1944 – 30 September 1944

Campaign Streamer	Campaign	Dates	Notes
	Air Offensive, Europe	7 March 1944 – 5 June 1944	406th Fighter Squadron
	Normandy	6 June 1944 – 24 July 1944	406th Fighter Squadron
	Northern France	25 July 1944 – 14 September 1944	406th Fighter Squadron
	Rhineland	5 September 1944 – 21 March 1945	406th Fighter Squadron
	Ardennes-Alsace	16 December 1944 – 25 January 1945	406th Fighter Squadron
	Central Europe	22 March 1944 – 21 May 1945	406th Fighter Squadron
	Air Combat, EAME Theater	7 March 1944 – 11 May 1945	406th Fighter Squadron

== See also ==
- List of United States Air Force air refueling squadrons
