= 92nd Air Refueling Wing =

92d Air Refueling Wing

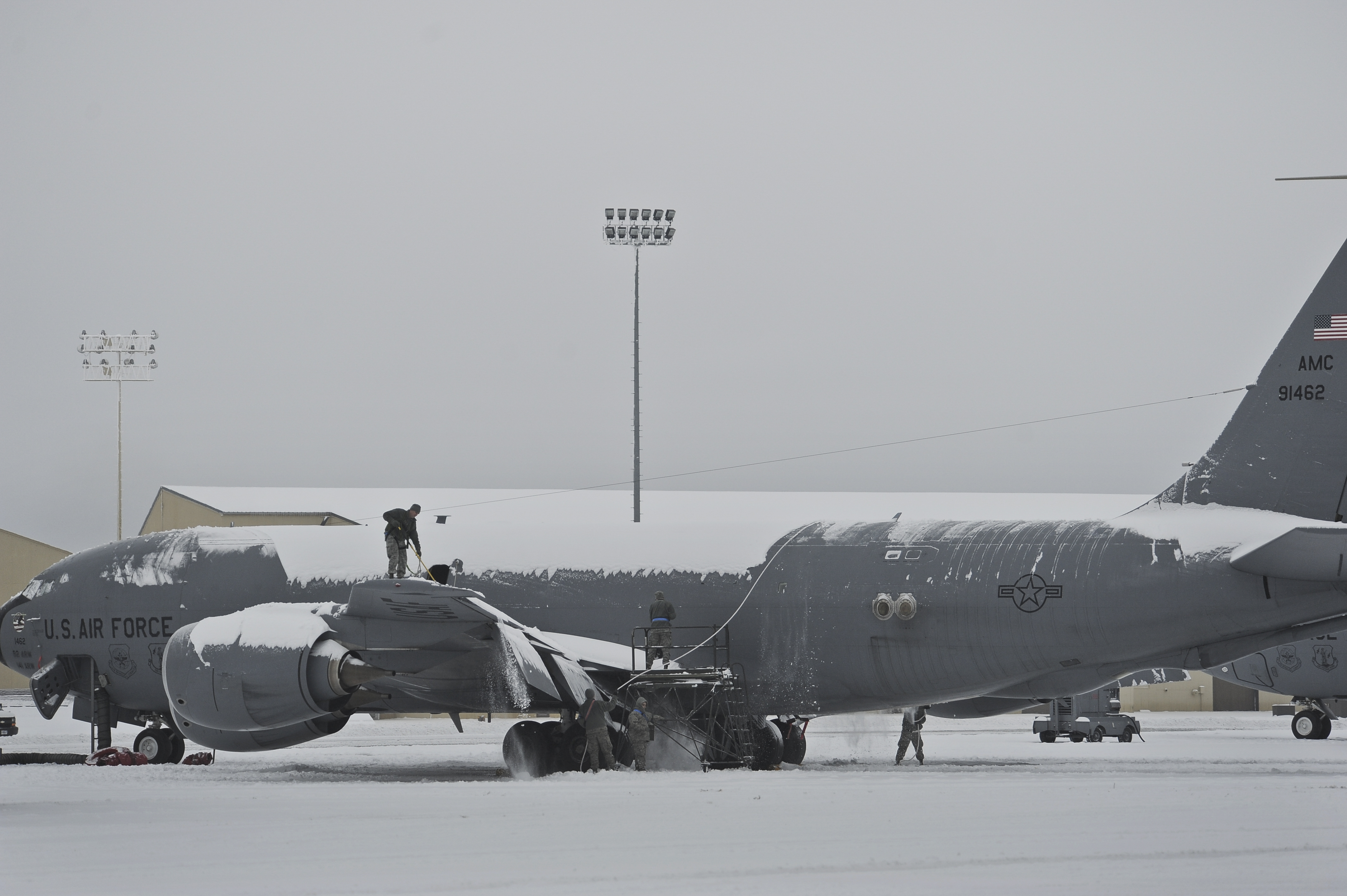
- Wing KC-135 Stratotanker after a snowfall at Fairchild AFB
- Active: 1947–1948; 1948–present
- Country: United States
- Branch: United States Air Force
- Role: Aerial refueling
- Part of: Air Mobility Command
- Garrison/HQ: Fairchild Air Force Base
- Mottos: Duplum Incolumitatis (Latin for 'Twofold Security'); Higher, Stronger, Faster
- Decorations: Air Force Meritorious Unit Award; Air Force Outstanding Unit Award

Commanders
- Notable commanders: General Arthur Lichte; General David Wade

Insignia
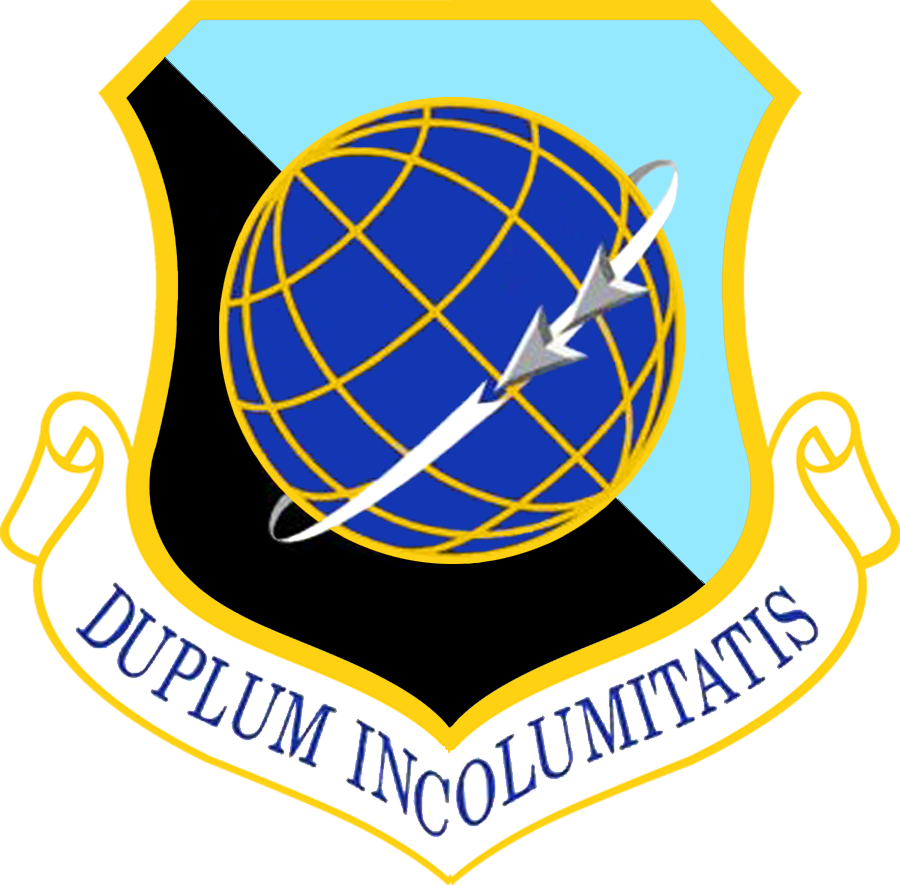
- 92d Air Refueling Wing emblem (Note: Approved 7 July 1994.)

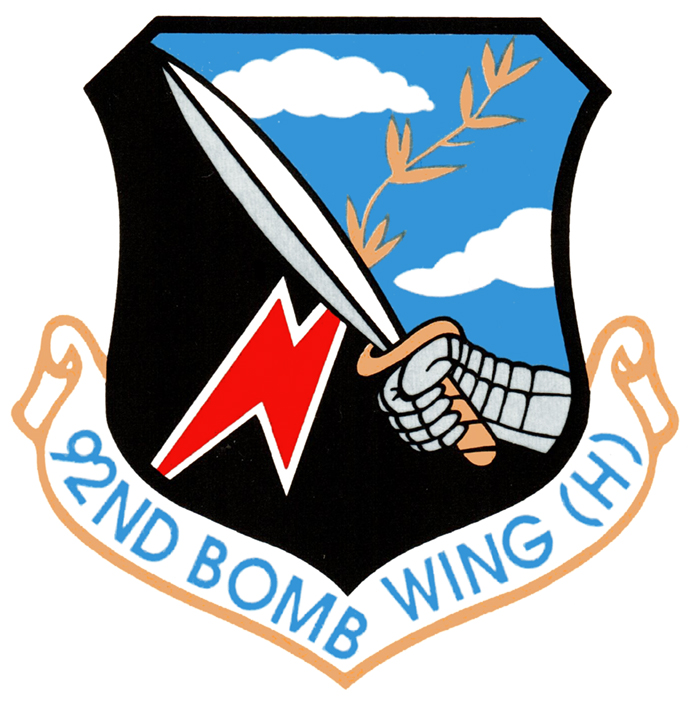
- 92d Bombardment Wing emblem (Note: Approved 21 November 1957.)

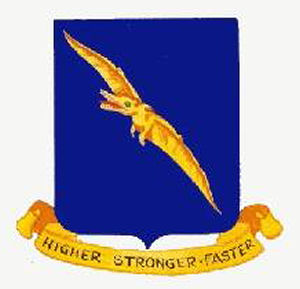
- 92d Bombardment Wing emblem (Note: Approved 9 June 1952. This emblem was originally approved for the 92d Bombardment Group on 9 March 1943. Maurer, Combat Squadrons pp. 158-160)

Aircraft flown
- Tanker: Boeing KC-135 Stratotanker

The 92nd Air Refueling Wing is a United States Air Force unit assigned to the Air Mobility Command Eighteenth Air Force. It is stationed at Fairchild Air Force Base, Washington. The wing is also the host unit at Fairchild. The wing carries out air refueling, passenger and cargo airlift, and aero-medical evacuation missions.

From 1948 to 1992, the 92d Bombardment Wing was a part of Strategic Air Command's nuclear deterrent force during the Cold War.

The 92d Air Refueling Wing is commanded by Colonel Chesley L. Dycus, its Vice Commander is Colonel Garret J. Bilbo and Command Chief Master Sergeant is Chief Master Sergeant William J. Arcuri.

== History ==
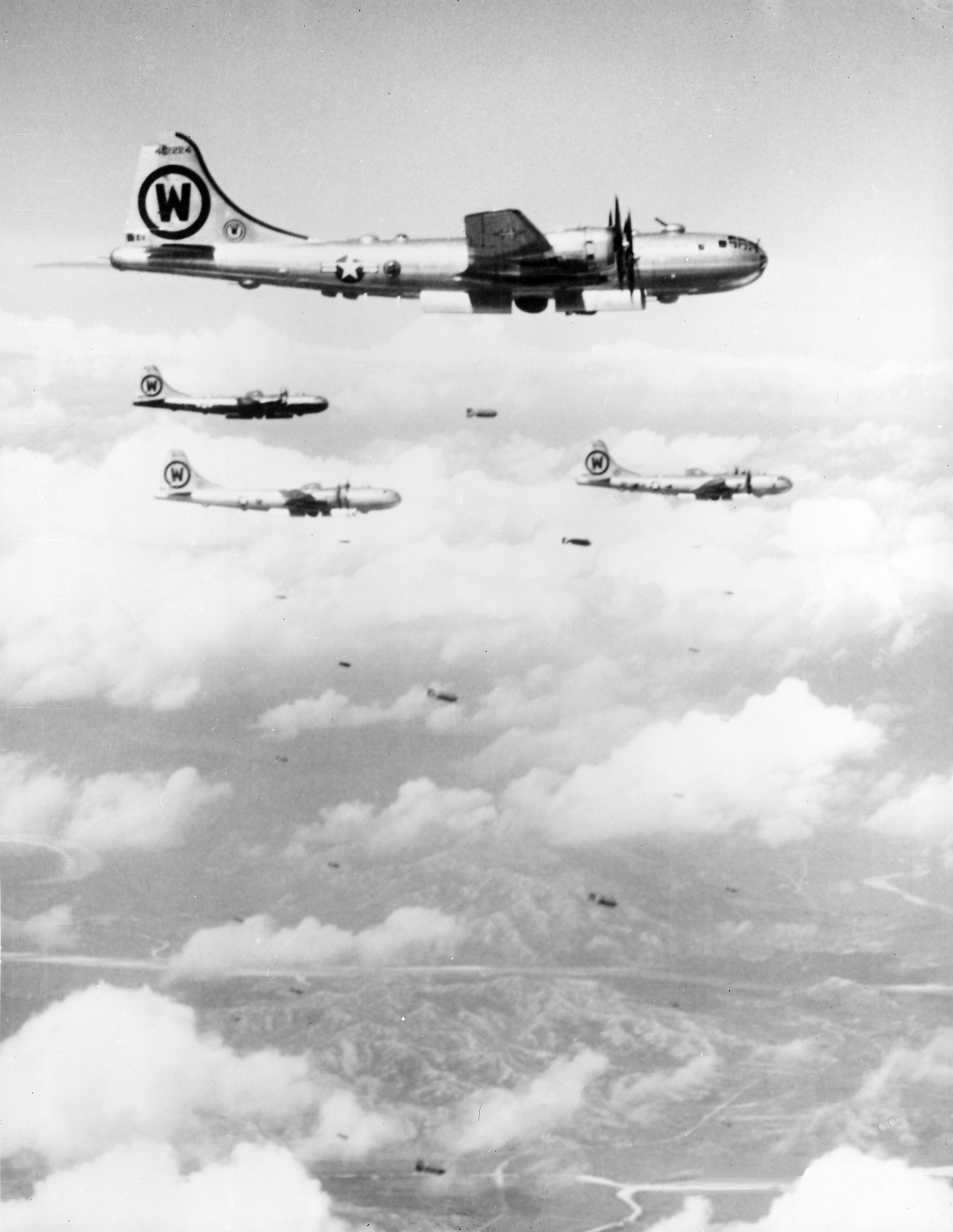
92nd B-29s bombing a target in Korea, September 1950.

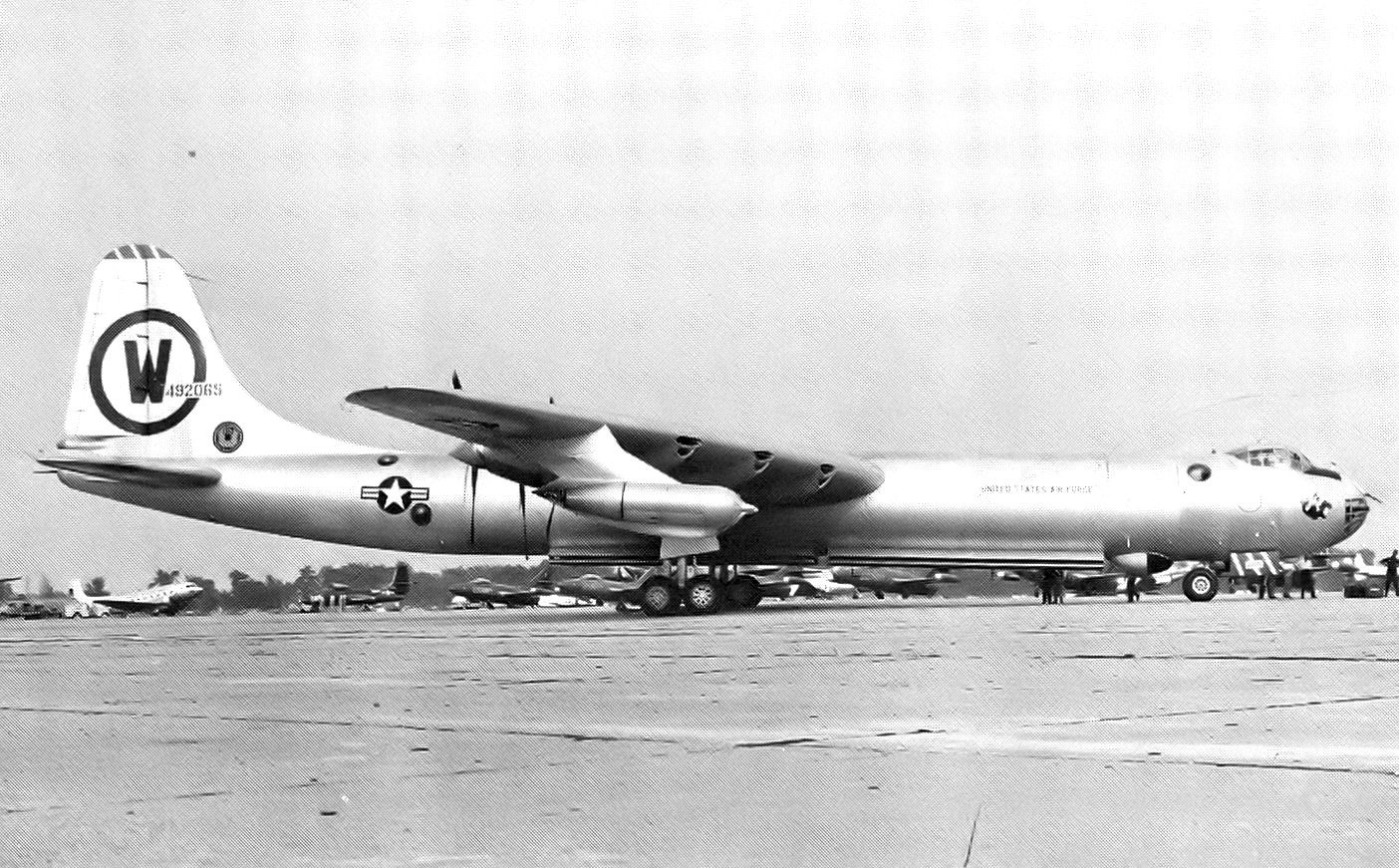
92d Bombardment Wing B-36B Peacemaker (Note: Aircraft is Consolidated B-36B Peacemaker, serial 44-92065, shown in 1952 after conversion to B-36D with the addition of four General Electric J47-GE-19 turbojets. Shows 326th Bombardment Squadron emblem, red/yellow tail flashes.)

On 17 November 1947, the 92d Bombardment Wing, Very Heavy was organized at Spokane Army Air Field, Washington as part of the United States Air Force's wing base reorganization, in which combat groups and all supporting units on a base were assigned to a single wing. The 92d Bombardment Group, flying Boeing B-29 Superfortresses became its operational component. It served as a double-sized B-29 wing until April 1950, and again from May 1950 to April 1951, although one bomb group was generally deployed overseas for training or combat in Korea. It also supervised the 454th Bombardment Group, a Reserve corollary bomb group from June 1949 until February 1951, when the 454th was called to active duty for the Korean War.

Upon return to the United States, the wing reequipped with the Convair B-36 Peacemaker. In August and September 1953, the wing completed the first mass flight of B-36s to the Far East in Operation Big Stick. The 92d visited bases in Japan, Okinawa and Guam. Big Stick followed close on the heels of the end of hostilities in Korea and was intended to show American determination to keep the peace in the Far East. On 15 and 16 October 1954 the wing deployed to Andersen Air Force Base, Guam for 90 days. This was the first deployment of an entire wing of Peacemakers to an overseas base. The wing deployed to Andersen again from 26 April until 6 July 1956.

The wing added air refueling operations to bombardment mission in September 1957. From March to June 1959, the wing participated in Operation Head Start III, a precursor to Operation Chrome Dome. The 92d kept five of its Stratofortresses airborne at all times, with crews flying 24 hour missions with the support of ten KC-135 tankers. In January 1961, SAC disclosed it was maintaining an airborne force for "airborne alert training."

From July 1961 to August 1965, controlled an SM-65E Atlas missile squadron. Supported SAC activities in Southeast Asia from early 1965 to December 1975 through deployment of bomber and tanker aircraft and crews and Air Weather 9thWS Det3. In 1969, supplied aircraft for Operation Giant Lance over Alaska, a secret mission designed to intimidate the Soviet Union into backing away from supporting the North Vietnamese.

From March–September 1968, March–September 1969, and June 1972-October 1973, all wing Boeing B-52 Stratofortresses and many Boeing KC-135 Stratotankers, plus aircrews and support personnel, were involved in Southeast Asia operations. After 1975, performed joint USAF/US Navy sea reconnaissance and surveillance missions. In 1983, the Wing's B-52Gs were modified to carry AGM-86B Air-Launched Cruise Missiles (ALCM). In 1985, upgraded to B-52H with improved strategic weapons carriage and offensive electronics capabilities. Earned the Fairchild Trophy in 1953, 1986, and again in 1992 when it won SAC's last competition and retired the trophy. Also won the Saunders Trophy for best air refueling unit in SAC for 1992. Provided KC-135 aircraft to tanker task forces in the US, Europe, and the Pacific through 1992.

=== Post Cold War era ===
Ended B-52 alert duties in September 1992, and ended bombardment mission in 1994, with transfer from Air Combat Command to Air Mobility Command upon departure of last B-52H. On 24 June 1994, a B-52H practicing for an airshow crashed on the airfield while making an unauthorized, low altitude, steep turn. The aircraft exceeded 90 degrees of bank, entered a stall and impacted the ground killing all on board, including the squadron commander and chief of standardization-evaluation. The pilot, Lt Col Arthur "Bud" Holland, maneuvered the bomber beyond its operational limits and lost control. The aircraft stalled, fell to the ground and exploded, killing Holland and the other three USAF officers aboard. The crash was captured on video and was shown repeatedly on news broadcasts throughout the world.

As a purely air refueling unit, the group's squadrons routinely augmented AMC's overseas tanker task forces in Panama, Europe, Turkey, and Southwest Asia, providing aerial refueling to attack and transport aircraft.

The wing deployed personnel and aircraft to expeditionary bases in the United Kingdom, France, Germany, and Spain as part of the Kosovo War (NATO Operation Allied Force) in 1999. That year, the Wing became the 92d Air Expeditionary Wing at Morón Air Base in Spain, tasked with providing fuel to NATO aircraft involved in the war. In addition to serving as the HQ 92 AEW (serving units in France, Crete, Sicily and Spain), Morón hosted 37 tankers (KC-135 and KC-10) and 800 personnel. The 92 AEW became the largest tanker wing since the Vietnam War and held the distinction of being the largest tanker base during the Kosovo War.

In the mid-2010s, wing staff officially stated that the wing 'operate[d] 34 KC-135 R/T Stratotanker refueling aircraft valued at $1.6 billion and 58 aircrews to support worldwide military missions. Serving as Fairchild Air Force Base host unit, the wing control[led] 4,223 acres (17.09 km^{2}) and 1,248 buildings. The wing employ[ed] over 2,200 active-duty military, as well as over 700 civilian employees.'

=== Structure in the early 2020s ===
The 92d Air Refueling Wing is structured under four groups: Operations, maintenance, mission support and medical, as well as 12 staff agencies organized under the Director of Staff.

- 92d Operations Group

Primarily responsible for the wing's four flying squadrons - the 92d, 93d, 97th and 384th Air Refueling Squadrons, which fly the KC-135R Stratotanker. The 92d Operations Support Squadron manages functions such as intelligence, weather, tactics, aircrew training, life support supervision, airfield management, air traffic control, combat crew communications and current operations. The 92d OSS is also responsible for managing the airfield, weather station, control tower and flight simulators for the wing.

  - 92d Air Refueling Squadron
  - 93d Air Refueling Squadron
  - 97th Air Refueling Squadron
  - 384th Air Refueling Squadron
  - 92d Operations Support Squadron
- 92d Maintenance Group

Provides field-level maintenance support for 34 KC-135 R/T aircraft and 240 pieces of aerospace ground equipment supporting peace and wartime worldwide aerial refueling and airlift operations. The group also provides services for transient contract and military aircraft. Furthermore, the 92d Maintenance Group maintains a high state of combat readiness for over 650 personnel and equipment supporting worldwide contingency and nuclear deterrence operations, while also maintaining base munitions.

- 92d Mission Support Group

Provides professional civil engineer, communications, contracting, logistics, mission support, security forces, and combat, community, and family support services. Additionally, through the wing's Air Expeditionary Force Cell, the 92d MSG integrates all wing readiness functions to train, deploy and reintegrate up to 1,300 personnel annually who deploy worldwide.

- 92d Medical Group

Serves more than 12,640 military beneficiaries, with a staff of 308 and an annual budget of $12.3 million. The medical clinic receives over 53,688 outpatient visits and 12,975 dental visits annually. The group currently manages the 92d Aeromedical Dental Squadron, 92d Medical Operations Squadron and the 92d Medical Support Squadron.

Wing staff agencies consist of a variety of functions. These functions include legal, plans and programs, safety, command and control, chapel, public affairs, military equal opportunity, sexual assault prevention program, protocol, history and the inspector general.

== Lineage ==
- Designated as the 92d Bombardment Wing, Very Heavy and organized on 17 November 1947

Discontinued on 12 July 1948 (Note: The 1947 organization was a table of distribution unit organized as part of the Air Force's experimental wing base organization reorganization. It was replaced by a table of organization unit in July 1948. Ravenstein, pp. xxi, 128. The two wings were later formally consolidated. Department of the Air Force/MPM Letter 539q, 31 January 1984, Subject: Consolidation of Units.)
Redesignated 92d Bombardment Wing, Medium and activated on 12 July 1948
Redesignated 92d Bombardment Wing, Heavy on 16 June 1951
Redesignated 92d Strategic Aerospace Wing on 15 February 1962
Redesignated 92d Bombardment Wing, Heavy on 31 March 1972
Redesignated 92d Wing on 1 September 1991
Redesignated 92d Bomb Wing on 1 June 1992
Redesignated 92d Air Refueling Wing on 1 July 1994

== Assignments ==
- Fifteenth Air Force, 17 November 1947
- 57th Air Division, 16 April 1951 (attached to 3rd Air Division, 16 October 1954 – 12 January 1955 and 26 April-6 July 1956)
- Fifteenth Air Force, 4 September 1956
- 18th Air (later, 18th Strategic Aerospace) Division, 1 July 1959 (attached to 14th Strategic Aerospace Division after 15 June 1968)
- 14th Strategic Aerospace Division, 2 July 1968
- 4th Strategic Aerospace Division, 31 March 1970
- 47th Air Division, 30 June 1971
- 57th Air Division, 23 January 1987
- Fifteenth Air Force, 15 June 1988
- Twelfth Air Force, 1 June 1992
- Fifteenth Air Force, 1 July 1994
- Eighteenth Air Force, 1 October 2003 – present

== Components ==
Wings

- 90th Bombardment Wing: attached 2 January 1951 – 31 January 1951
- 98th Bombardment Wing: attached 17 November 1947 - 15 April 1950 and 16 May 1950 - 31 March 1951

Groups

- 92d Bombardment Group (later 92d Operations Group): 17 November 1947 – 16 June 1952 (detached 7 February-19 May 1949 and 9 July-30 October 1950); 1 September 1991–present
- 98th Bombardment Group: attached 17 November 1947 – 21 August 1948, 10 December 1948 – 16 May 1949 and 18 August 1949 – 15 April 1950; rear echelon (no aircraft or crews) attached 2 August 1950 – 16 April 1951
- 454th Bombardment Group: attached 27 June 1949 – 16 June 1951

Squadrons

- 22d Air Refueling Squadron: 15 June 1960 – 1 July 1962
- 43d Air Refueling Squadron: 2 April 1966 – 1 September 1991 (detached c. 22 March-8 July 1968 and 9 June-14 September 1969)
- 92d Air Refueling Squadron: 1 July 1957 – 1 September 1991 (detached until 13 September 1957)
- 325th Bombardment Squadron: attached 16 February 1951 – 15 June 1952, assigned 16 June 1952 – 1 September 1991
- 326th Bombardment Squadron: attached 16 February 1951 – 15 June 1952, assigned 16 June 1952 – 1 April 1961 (detached after 1 March 1961)
- 327th Bombardment Squadron: attached 16 February 1951 – 15 June 1952, assigned 16 June 1952 – 1 June 1960
- 567th Strategic Missile Squadron: 1 April 1960 – 25 June 1965

== Stations ==
- Spokane Army Air Field (later Spokane Air Force Base, Fairchild Air Force Base), Washington, 17 November 1947 – present

== Aircraft and missiles ==
- Boeing B-29 Superfortress, 1947–1950, 1950–1952
- Boeing KB-29 Superfortress, 1948–1950, 1950–1952
- Convair B-36 Peacemaker, 1951–1957
- Boeing B-52 Stratofortress, 1957–1968, 1968–1969, 1969–1972, 1973–1994
- Boeing KC-135 Stratotanker, 1958–present
- SM-65E Atlas, 1961–1965
- Cessna T-37 Tweet, 1991–1994
- Bell UH-1 Huey, 1993–present

== See also ==
- List of B-52 Units of the United States Air Force
