= 326th Bombardment Squadron =

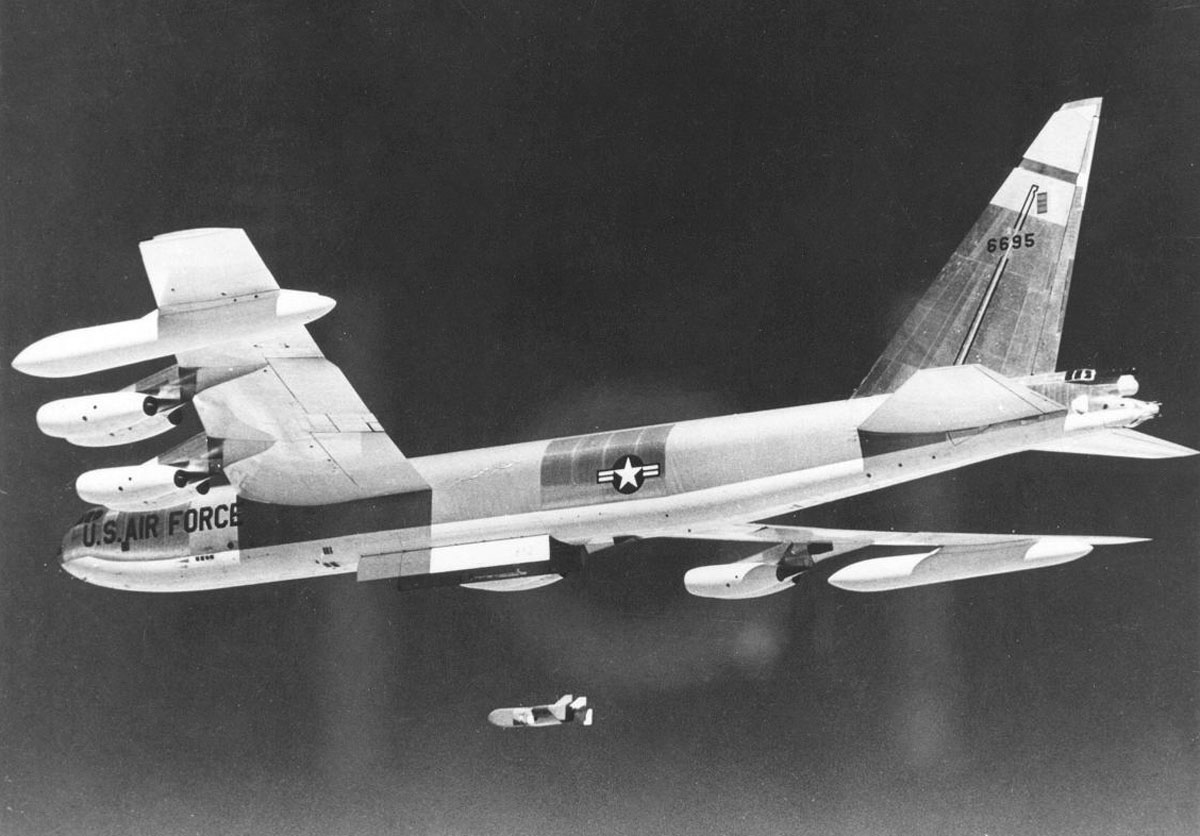
- B-52D Stratofortress as flown by the squadron (Note: Aircraft is Boeing B-52D-40-BW, serial 56-695. This aircraft is on display at Tinker Air Force Base, Oklahoma. Baugher, Joe (15 February 2023). "1956 USAF Serial Numbers". Joe Baugher.)
- Active: 1942–1946; 1946–1963
- Country: United States
- Branch: United States Air Force
- Role: Strategic bomber
- Engagements: European Theater of Operations
- Decorations: Distinguished Unit Citation; Air Force Outstanding Unit Award; Republic of Korea Presidential Unit Citation

Insignia
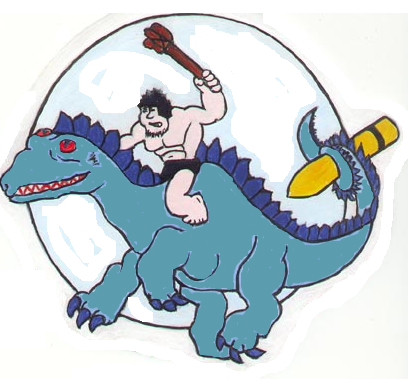
- 326th Bombardment Squadron emblem (Note: Description: Over and through a white disc, thin border black, the comic strip character Alley Oop, proper, with stone club grasped in left hand in striking position, all proper, astride the back of a blue-green dinosaur, trimmed dark blue, tail entwined about large yellow aerial bomb.)
- World War II fuselage code: JW

The 326th Bombardment Squadron is an inactive United States Air Force unit. It was last assigned to the 4141st Strategic Wing at Glasgow Air Force Base, Montana, where it was inactivated on 1 February 1963.

The squadron was first activated in March 1942. After participating in the antisubmarine campaign while training, it moved to the United Kingdom in August 1942, where it became a training unit for heavy bombers. From May 1943, it participated in the strategic bombing campaign against Germany. It earned two Distinguished Unit Citations for its actions. After V-E Day, it moved to France, performing airlift missions until it was inactivated in February 1946.

The squadron was activated at Fort Worth Army Air Field, Texas the following August as a Strategic Air Command (SAC) long range bomber unit. It deployed to Japan in 1950, flying missions during the Korean War. It moved to Glasgow in April 1961, as part of a SAC program to disperse its strategic bomber forces to reduce vulnerability to a surprise attack. In February 1963 it was inactivated and its resources transferred to another squadron as part of a SAC program to replace its strategic wings with units with distinguished combat histories.

== History ==
=== World War II ===
==== Initial organization and training ====
The squadron was activated at Barksdale Field, Louisiana on 1 March 1942, as the 326th Bombardment Squadron, one of the four original squadrons of the 92nd Bombardment Group. Later that month it moved to MacDill Field, Florida and trained with Boeing B-17 Flying Fortresses. While training in Florida, the squadron also flew antisubmarine patrols off the Florida coast. The squadron's air echelon departed Sarasota Army Air Field for Westover Field, Massachusetts on 19 June 1942, flying on to Dow Field, Maine on 29 June. The squadron then ferried their B-17s across the North Atlantic via Newfoundland starting between 12 and 15 August. They flew directly from Newfoundland to Prestwick Airport, Scotland. The 92nd Group was the first to fly their bombers non-stop across the Atlantic, and the 326th was the first squadron in the group to make the transit. (Note: The 97th Bombardment Group had flown its planes across the Atlantic with stops in Greenland and Iceland. Freeman, pp. 6-7.) Meanwhile, the ground echelon left Bradenton on 18 July, arriving at Fort Dix, New Jersey in the New York Port of Embarkation two days later. It sailed aboard the USS West Point (AP-23) on 2 August and docked at Liverpool on 18 August, moving to Bovingdon the same day.

==== Operations in the European Theater ====
The buildup of Eighth Air Force in England required the establishment of a combat crew replacement and training center, but a lack of qualified personnel and aircraft hampered its development. As a result, the decision was made to use the 92nd Group and its squadrons as a temporary crew training unit, acting as the main component of what became the 11th Combat Crew Replacement Center Group. However, the 92d was the first group to arrive in England with improved B-17Fs, and with the training mission came an exchange of these newer models for the older B-17Es of the 97th Bombardment Group to use in training. On 6 September, to provide the squadron with combat experience, it flew its first combat mission against Meaulte, France. Although remaining a replacement crew training unit until May 1943, the squadron initially flew occasional combat missions. In January 1943, he squadron moved to RAF Alconbury.

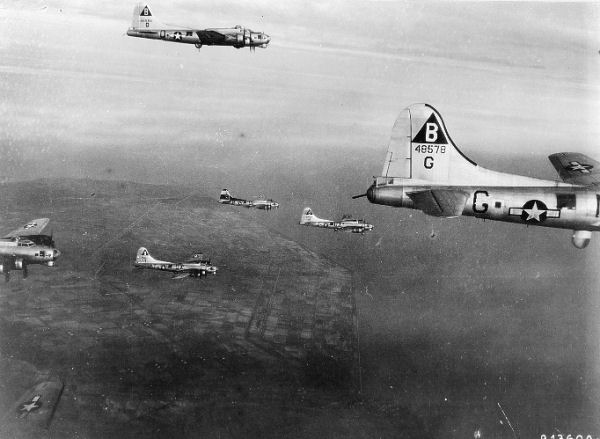
92d Bombardment Group B-17s (Note: In foreground is Lockheed Vega built Boeing B-17G-70-VE Flying Fortress, serial 44-8579. This plane survived the war and was sold for scrap in 1946. Baugher, Joe (11 February 2023). "1944 USAF Serial Numbers". Joe Baugher.)

In May 1943, the squadron's training mission was transferred and the 326th began flying combat missions. Through May 1944 its targets included shipyards at Kiel, ball bearing plants at Schweinfurt, submarine pens at Wilhelmshaven, a tire manufacturing plant at Hannover, airfields near Paris, an aircraft factory at Nantes and a magnesium mine in Norway.

The squadron earned a Distinguished Unit Citation on 11 January 1944, when it successfully bombed aircraft manufacturing factories in central Germany despite adverse weather, a lack of fighter protection and heavy flak. It participated in Big Week, the intensive attack against German aircraft industry in late February 1944. It took part in Operation Crossbow, attacks on launch sites for V-1 flying bombs and V-2 rockets. It struck airfields and industrial sites in France, Belgium, the Netherlands, and Germany. After October 1944 it concentrated on transportation and oil industry targets.

In addition to its strategic bombing mission, the squadron flew interdiction and air support missions. During Operation Overlord, the Normandy invasion, it attacked coastal defenses, transportation junctions and marshalling yards near the beachhead. It provided air support for Operation Cobra, the Allied breakout at Saint Lo, It bombed bridges and gun positions to support Operation Market Garden, the airborne attacks in the Netherlands near Arnhem, to secure bridgeheads across the Rhine in September. During the Battle of the Bulge, from December 1944 to January 1945, it attacked bridges and marshalling yards near the target area. During Operation Varsity, the airborne assault across the Rhine, it provided cover by bombing airfields near the drop zone. It flew its last combat mission on 25 April 1945, when the 92nd Group led the entire Eighth Air Force formation.

Following V-E Day, the squadron moved to Istres Air Base, France, where it participated in the Green Project, transporting troops returning to the United States, flying them to Cazes Field in Morocco until September, returning French servicemen to France on return trips. During the winter it flew displaced Greek nationals from Munich to Athens. It was inactivated in France on 28 February 1946 and its remaining personnel were absorbed into elements of the 306th Bombardment Group at Lechfeld Air Base, Germany.

==== Medal of Honor ====
Flight Officer John C. Morgan of the squadron was awarded the Medal of Honor for a mission on 26 July 1943. He was flying as copilot, when an attack by enemy fighter aircraft caused a brain injury to the pilot, leaving the pilot in a crazed condition. Morgan kept his B-17 in formation, flying with one hand as he fended off the semiconscious pilot, who was attempting to take control of the bomber for two hours until the navigator was able to control the pilot, finally landing the plane safely at its home station. Morgan was used as the model for the character Lieutenant Jesse Bishop in the novel and film Twelve O'Clock High.

=== Strategic Air Command ===
==== B-29 Superfortress operations ====
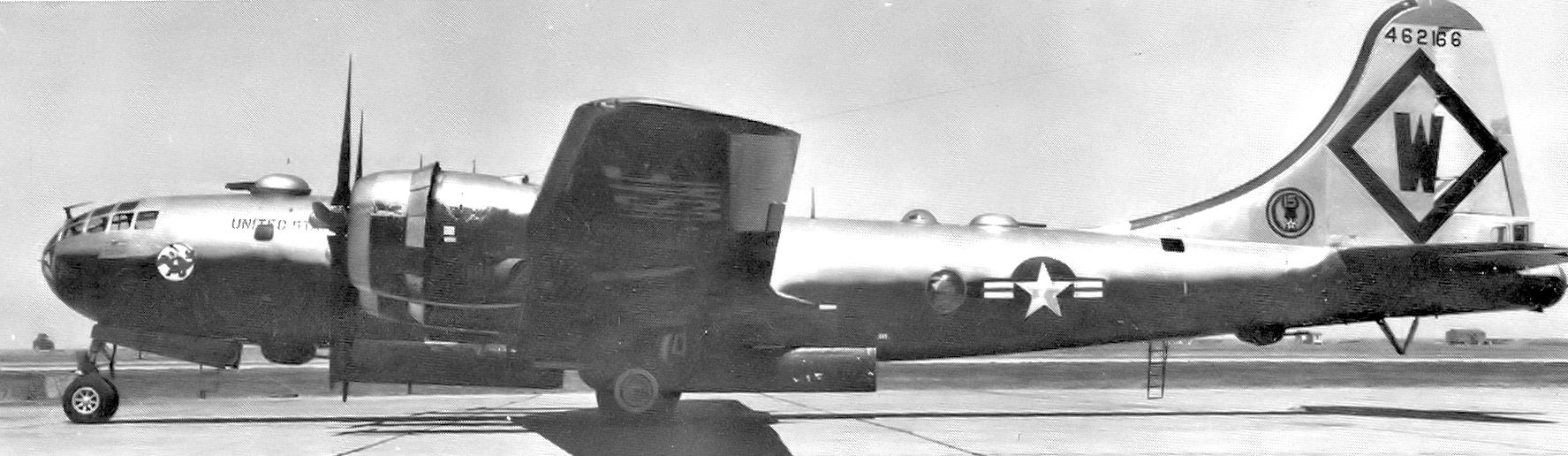
92d Bombardment Group B-29 Superfortress (Note: Aircraft is Boeing B-29A-65-BN Superfortress, serial 44-62166 at Smoky Hill Army Air Field, Kansas, It has the 326th Squadron emblem in front. The plane crashed near Taegu, South Korea on 22 July 1952. Dirkx, Marco (21 June 2024). "1944 USAF Serial Numbers". Joe Baugher’s Serial Number List.)

The squadron was soon reactivated at Fort Worth Army Air Field, Texas as a Strategic Air Command (SAC) squadron in August 1946, when it absorbed the personnel and Boeing B-29 Superfortresses of the 713th Bombardment Squadron, which was simultaneously inactivated. In October, the squadron moved to Smoky Hill Army Air Field, Kansas, but its stay there was short, as it moved to Spokane Army Air Field in June 1947. It trained for strategic bombardment missions at all three locations. The squadron deployed to RAF Sculthorpe with other combat elements of the 92nd Group between April and February 1949. This deployment of B-29s, which were known to be capable of carrying nuclear weapons, was part of a show of force to support the Berlin Airlift. In reality, the squadron's B-29s had not been modified to be armed with nuclear weapons.

In July 1950, the squadron deployed to Yokota Air Base, Japan, where it came under the control of Far East Air Forces Bomber Command (Provisional). The squadron bombed factories, refineries, iron works, hydroelectric plants, airfields, bridges, tunnels, troop concentrations, barracks, marshalling yards, road junctions, rail lines, supply dumps, docks, vehicles and other strategic and interdiction targets. It returned to Fairchild Air Force Base in late October 1950.

==== B-36 Peacemaker operations ====
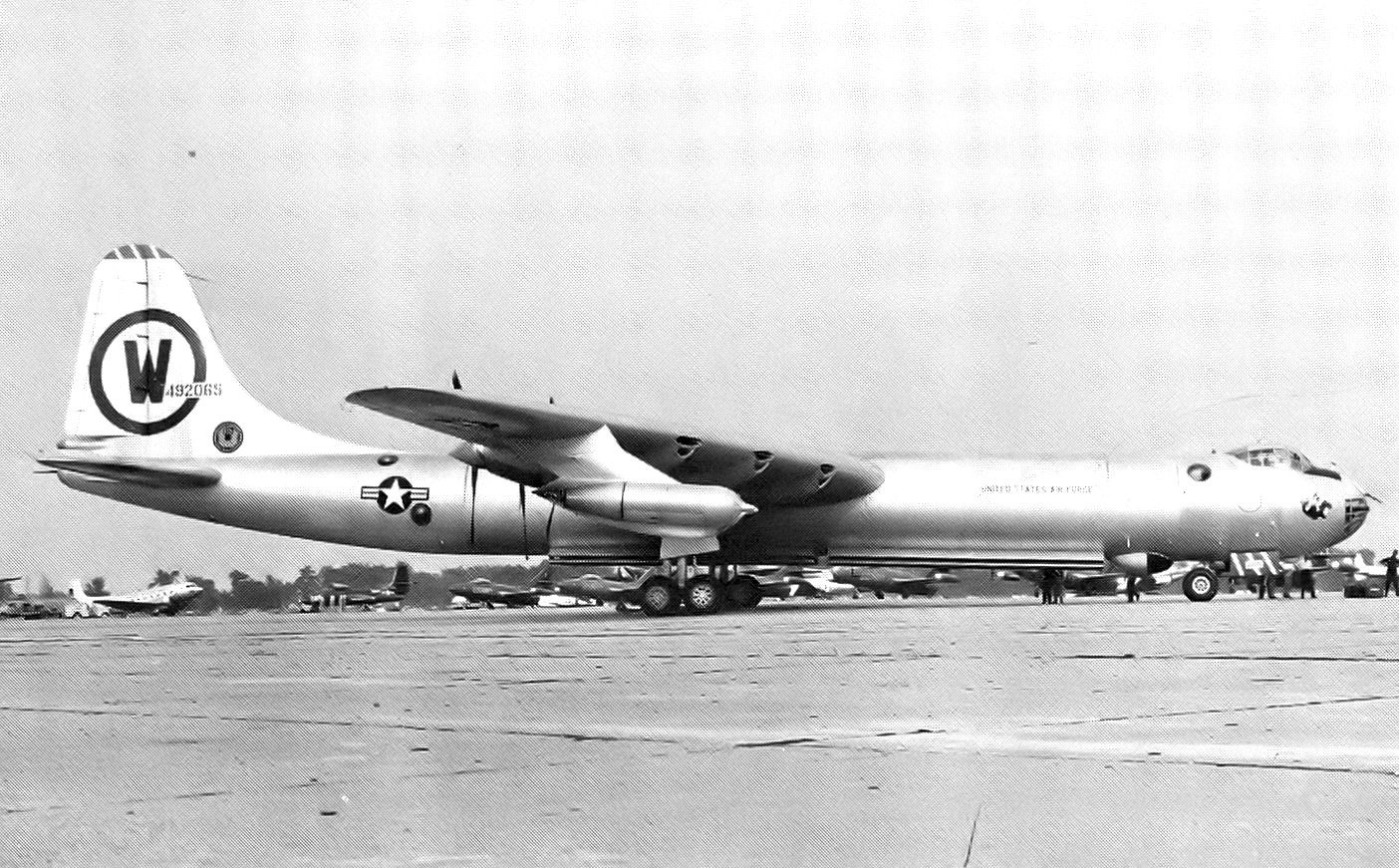
Squadron B-36 Peacemaker (Note: Aircraft is Consolidated B-36D-45-CF Peacemaker, serial 44-92065. Built as a B-36B-15-CF, later converted to B-36D by the addition of four jet engines. It was transferred to the Military Aircraft Storage and Disposition Center on 27 February 1957 and scrapped. Dirkx, Marco (18 August 2025). "1944 USAF Serial Numbers". Joe Baugher’s Serial Number List.)

In 1951, the squadron transitioned to the Convair B-36 Peacemaker intercontinental strategic bomber. The squadron participated in Operation Big Stick, a show of force in which the 92nd Wing deployed its B-36s to Japan. The squadron received the Air Force Outstanding Unit Award for its participation in this exercise. Along with other operational elements of the 92d Bombardment Wing, the squadron deployed to Andersen Air Force Base, Guam from 16 October 1954 to 12 January 1955 and again from 26 April to 5 July 1956. In the fall of 1956, the wing assumed an alert status due to tensions in the Middle East. It continued flying B-36s until 1957, when it began upgrading to Boeing B-52D Stratofortresses. (Note: This transition was nicknamed Operation Big Switch. A Legacy of Excellence, p. 14.)

==== B-52 Stratofortress operations ====
Starting in 1960, one third of the squadron's aircraft were maintained on fifteen minute alert, fully fueled and ready for combat to reduce vulnerability to a Soviet missile strike. This was increased to half the squadron's aircraft in 1962. SAC planners were looking into methods to protect their forces in addition to the ground alert program as early as 1957. Tests under the name Operation Head Start were precursors to Operation Chrome Dome. From 2 March to 30 June 1959, the 92nd Wing participated in Operation Head Start II, keeping five of its armed bombers in the air for the entire period. In January 1961, SAC disclosed it was maintaining an airborne force for "airborne alert training."

Large concentrations of bombers, like the 45 B-52s of the 92nd Wing at Fairchild, made attractive targets for an enemy strike. SAC decided to disperse its B-52 force to smaller wings with 15 bombers at other bases. This not only complicated Soviet targeting planning, but with more runways, it would take less time to launch the bomber force. In April 1961, the squadron moved to Glasgow Air Force Base, Montana, where it became the strike component of the 4141st Strategic Wing.

Soon after detection of Soviet missiles in Cuba, SAC brought all degraded and adjusted alert sorties up to full capability. On 20 October along with all B-52 units except those equipped with the B-52H, the squadron was directed to put two additional planes on alert. On 22 October, 1/8 of the squadron's B-52s were placed on airborne alert. Two days later, SAC went to DEFCON 2, placing all aircraft on alert. SAC returned to normal airborne alert posture on 21 November . On 27 November, SAC finally returned the squadron to its normal alert posture.

In February 1963, The 91st Bombardment Wing assumed the aircraft, personnel and equipment of the discontinued 4141st Wing. The 4141st was a Major Command controlled (MAJCON) wing, which could not carry a permanent history or lineage, and SAC wanted to replace it with a permanent unit. In this reorganization, the 326th was inactivated, and its mission, personnel and equipment were transferred to the 322d Bombardment Squadron, which was simultaneousy activated.

== Lineage ==
- Constituted as the 326th Bombardment Squadron (Heavy) on 28 January 1942

Activated on 1 March 1942
Redesignated 326 Bombardment Squadron, Heavy on 29 September 1944
Inactivated on 28 February 1946

- Redesignated 326 Bombardment Squadron, Very Heavy on 15 July 1946

Activated on 4 August 1946
Redesignated 326 Bombardment Squadron, Medium on 28 May 1948
Redesignated 326 Bombardment Squadron, Heavy' on 16 June 1951
Discontinued and inactivated on 1 February 1963

=== Assignments ===
- 92d Bombardment Group, 1 March 1942 – 28 February 1946
- 92d Bombardment Group, 4 August 1946 (attached to 92d Bombardment Wing after 16 February 1951)
- 92d Bombardment Wing (later 92d Strategic Aerospace Wing, 92d Bombardment Wing), 16 June 1952 (attached to 4141st Strategic Wing after 1 March 1961)
- 4141st Strategic Wing, 1 April 1961 – 1 February 1963

=== Stations ===
- Barksdale Field, Louisiana, 1 March 1942
- MacDill Field, Florida, 26 March 1942
- Sarasota Army Air Field, Florida, 18 May–18 July 1942
- RAF Bovingdon (AAF-112), England, 18 August 1942
- RAF Alconbury (AAF-102), England, 6 January 1943
- RAF Podington (AAF-109), England, 15 September 1943
- Istres Air Base (AAF 196), (Y-17), France, 12 June 1945 – 28 February 1946
- Fort Worth Army Air Field, Texas, 4 August 1946
- Smoky Hill Army Air Field, Kansas, 26 October 1946
- Spokane Army Air Field (later Spokane Air Force Base, Fairchild Air Force Base), Washington, 20 June 1947 (deployed to Yokota Air Base, Japan, 9 July–29 October 1950
- Glasgow Air Force Base, Montana, 1 April 1961 – 1 February 1963

=== Aircraft ===
- Boeing B-17 Flying Fortress, 1942–1946
- Boeing B-29 Superfortress, 1946, 1947–1951
- Convair B-36 Peacemaker, 1951–1957
- Boeing B-52 Stratofortress, 1957–1963

=== Awards and Campaigns ===
Award streamer	Award	Dates	Notes
	Distinguished Unit Citation	11 January 1944	Germany
	Distinguished Unit Citation	11 September 1944	Germany
	Air Force Outstanding Unit Award	22 August 1953-11 September 1953	
	Air Force Outstanding Unit Award	3 March 1959-6 October 1959	
	Republic of Korea Presidential Unit Citation	10 July-24 October 1950	

Campaign Streamer	Campaign	Dates	Notes
	Antisubmarine	26 March 1942–July 1942	
	Air Offensive, Europe	18 August 1942–5 June 1944	
	Air Combat, EAME Theater	18 August 1942–11 May 1945	
	Normandy	6 June 1944–24 July 1944	
	Northern France	25 July 1944–14 September 1944	
	Rhineland	15 September 1944–21 March 1945	
	Ardennes-Alsace	16 December 1944–25 January 1945	
	Central Europe	22 March 1944–21 May 1945	
	UN Defensive	9 July 1950–15 September 1950	
	UN Offensive	16 September 1950–29 October 1950	

== See also ==
- List of B-52 Units of the United States Air Force
- List of B-29 Superfortress operators
- B-17 Flying Fortress units of the United States Army Air Forces
