= 92nd Operations Group =

92d Operations Group
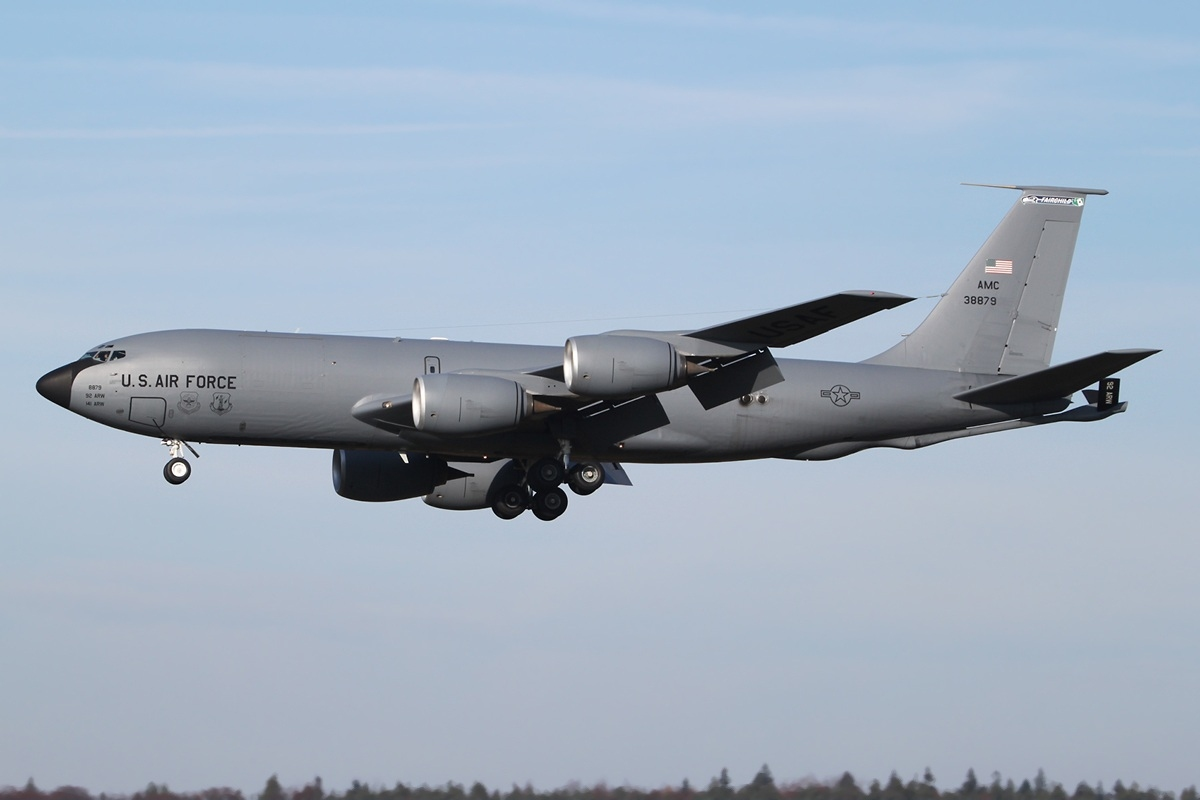
- KC-135R Stratotanker from Fairchild AFB
- Active: 1942–1946; 1946–1952; 1991–present
- Country: United States
- Branch: United States Air Force
- Type: Air Refueling
- Part of: Air Mobility Command; 18th Air Force; 92nd Air Refueling Wing
- Garrison/HQ: Fairchild Air Force Base
- Nickname: Blaze

Insignia
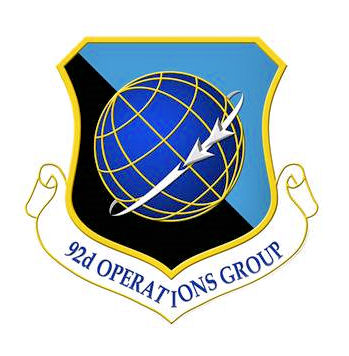
- 92d Operations Group emblem

Aircraft flown
- Tanker: Boeing KC-135 Stratotanker

The 92d Operations Group (92 OG) is the flying component of the 92d Air Refueling Wing, assigned to the United States Air Force Air Mobility Command Eighteenth Air Force. The group is stationed at Fairchild Air Force Base, Washington.

During World War II, the group's predecessor unit, the 92d Bombardment Group was the first VIII Bomber Command B-17 Flying Fortress heavy bombardment groups to carry out strategic bombardment operations against targets in Occupied Europe and Nazi Germany from RAF Bovingdon, England in September 1942. The 92d Bomb Group was the first Bomb group to make a non-stop Atlantic flight to United Kingdom. Its 327th BS was the only unit in the USAAF to be equipped with the service test "gunship" YB-40 Flying Fortress for combat, before fighter squadrons began receiving the P-51 Mustang for the same duties. It tested the secret Disney rocket-assisted-bomb experimental mission early in 1945, and led the Eighth Air Force on its last combat mission of the war.

In the postwar era, the 92d Bombardment Group was one of the first USAAF units assigned to the Strategic Air Command on 4 August 1946, prior to the establishment of the United States Air Force. The group being activated as a redesignation of the 448th Bombardment Group due to the Air Force's policy of retaining only low-numbered groups on active duty after the war.

It was deployed to Far East Air Force in 1950 and its B-29 Superfortress flew combat missions over North Korea early in the Korean War. The group was inactivated in 1952 when the parent wing adopted the Tri-Deputate organization and assigned all of the group's squadrons directly to the wing.

Reactivated as the 92d Operations Group in 1991 when the 92d Wing adopted the USAF Objective organization plan.

== World War II ==
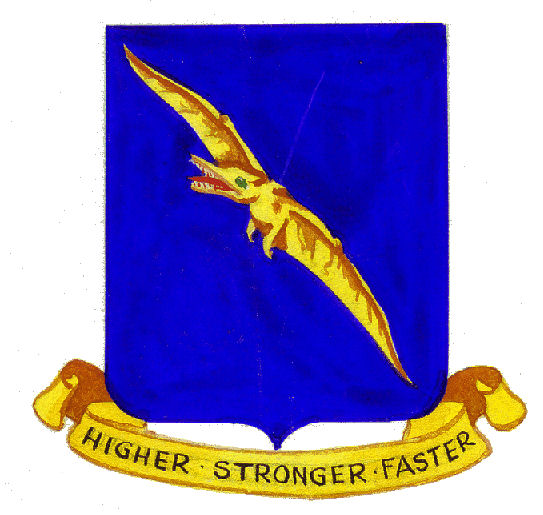
Emblem of the 92d Bombardment Group

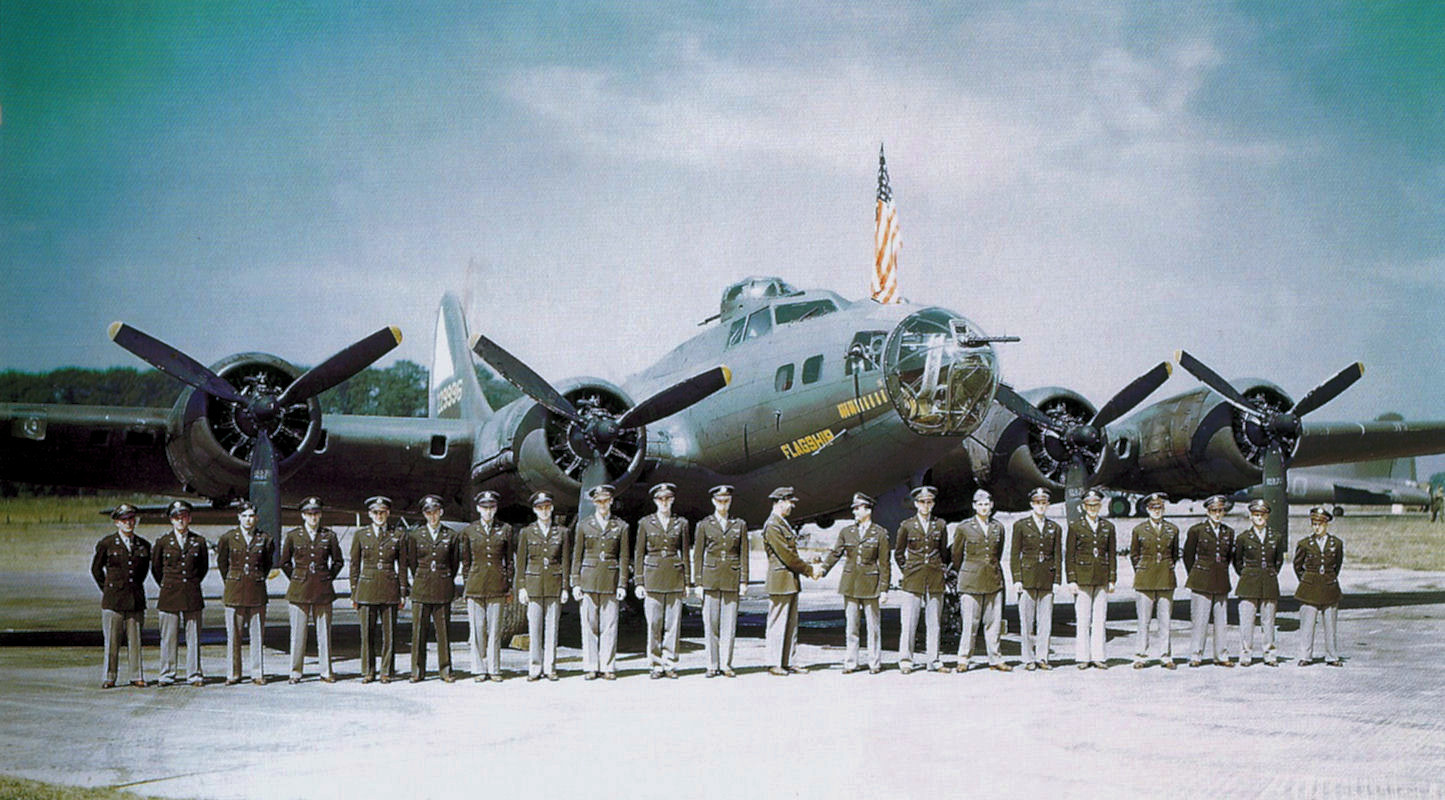
Senior Pilots pose in front of Boeing B-17F-80-BO, AAF Serial No.42-29996, (PY-R) "Flag Ship" from the 407th Bomb Squadron, 92nd Bomb Group This aircraft was lost on 16 November 1943 while returning from Norway commanded by 2Lt Joseph F Thornton. Of the crew; 9 POWs, one evaded capture. MACR 1384

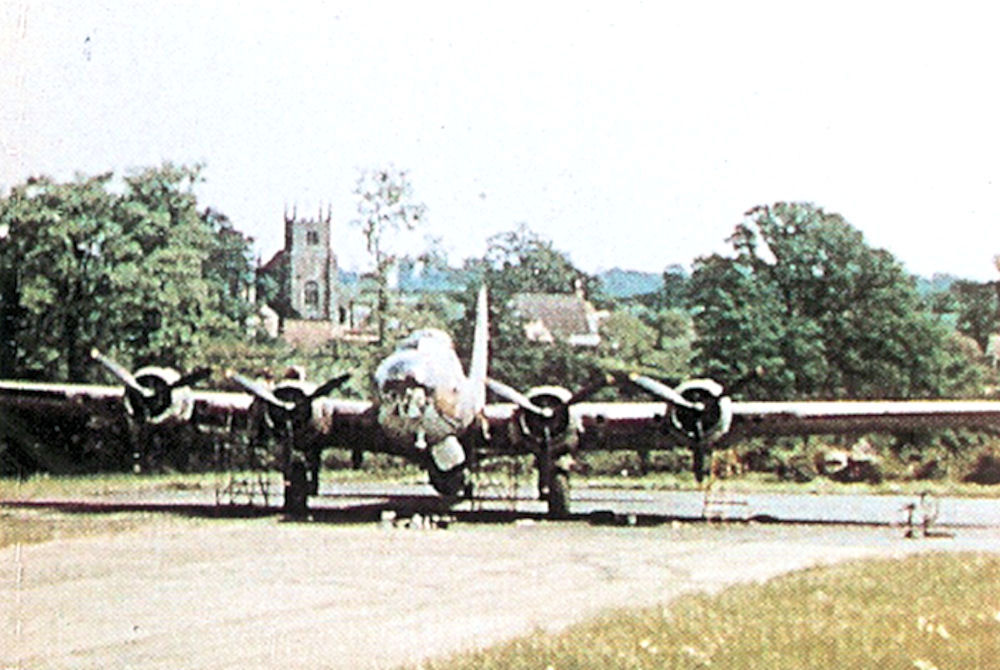
Unidentified 92d Bomb Group B-17F at Alconbury Airfield, summer 1943. In the background is a familiar sight to anyone who ever served at RAF Alconbury, the village of Little Stukeley

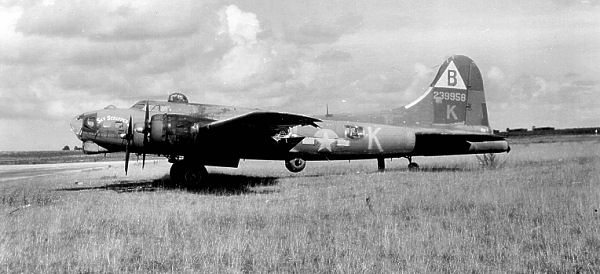
Lockheed/Vega B-17G-10-VE Flying Fortress, AAF Ser No. 42-39958 of the 92d Bomb Group. This aircraft suffered severe damage during a mission to Hamburg Germany on 4 November 1944 attacking the Harburg oil complex. It was written off after it landed safely.

The 92d Bombardment Group was activated on 1 March 1942 at Barksdale Field, Louisiana. After training at Sarasota Army Airfield, Florida from May–July 1942, the Air Echelon left for Westover Army Airfield, Massachusetts and moved to Dow Army Airfield, Maine on 29 June 1942. In August, the squadrons flew to Newfoundland and then direct across the Atlantic to Prestwick, Scotland. They were the first unit to make a non-stop Atlantic crossing from Gander, Newfoundland, to Prestwick. The Ground echelon sailed on USS West Point on 6 August 1942, and docked at Liverpool on 18 August 1942. This was the same day the first aircraft of the 326th Bomb squadron arrived in Bovingdon. The last squadron - the 407th - arrived on 28 August 1942.

The group was assigned to VIII Bomber Command and allocated RAF Bovingdon as its base. The group was assigned to the 40th Combat Bombardment Wing at RAF Thurleigh. The 92d flew two combat missions in September and October 1942, then was withdrawn from combat and its B-17F bombers exchanged for the older B-17E bombers being flown by the 97th Bomb Group.

The 92nd then acted as an operational training unit supplying combat crews to combat groups in the UK. However, in early 1943, the diversion to Operation Torch of heavy bomber groups originally planned for the Eighth Air Force led to a decision to return the 92d to combat operations, although its 326th Bomb Squadron was left to continue the OTU mission. The 325th squadron was used to provide a cadre for H2S radar training, and its 327th squadron acquired a special mission.

In January 1943, the 92d was transferred to RAF Alconbury where it was reformed as an operational combat group. At Alconbury the group took the name "Fame's Favorite Few", and its B-17s acquired the tail code of "Triangle B". The Group resumed operational flying missions on 1 May 1943. From Alconbury, the 92d engaged in bombing strategic targets, including shipyards at Kiel, ball-bearing plants at Schweinfurt, submarine installations at Wilhelmshaven, a tire plant at Hanover, airfields near Paris, an aircraft factory at Nantes, and a magnesium mine and reducing plant in Norway.

At Alconbury, the group's 327th Bombardment Squadron became the only squadron to be equipped with the experimental YB-40 Fortress gunship from May through August 1943. The YB-40 was developed to test the escort bomber concept. Because there were no fighters capable of escorting bomber formations on deep strike missions early in World War II, the USAAF tested heavily armed bombers to act as escorts and protect the bomb-carrying aircraft from enemy fighters. Twelve of the 22 B-17F bombers modified to the YB-40 configuration were dispatched to Alconbury for testing and evaluation.

The YB-40 project failed because the aircraft were able to effectively defend only themselves, were too slow because of excess weight and drag to keep up with bomber formations returning from missions, and had basic flight characteristics altered by the added drag and centre of gravity changes resulting from the changes. After 14 operational missions, the 11 surviving YB-40s were taken out of combat service and returned to the United States.

On 15 September 1943, the 92d BG was moved to RAF Podington (Station 109), near Wellingborough in Bedfordshire when the decision was made to take Alconbury off operational bombing missions and change the airfield's mission to pathfinder and radar-guided bombing with the 482d and 801st Bomb Groups.

From Podington, the group flew almost 300 operational missions over Nazi-Occupied Europe. Missions were flown to Wilhelmshaven, a tire plant at Hanover, airfields near Paris, an aircraft factory at Nantes, and a magnesium mine and reducing plant in Norway.

Although handicapped by weather conditions, enemy fire, and insufficient fighter protection, the 92d bombed aircraft factories in central Germany on 11 January 1944 and received a Distinguished Unit Citation for the mission.

The group took part in the intensive campaign of heavy bombers against the German aircraft industry during Big Week, 20–25 February 1944. After that, it attacked V-weapon sites in France; airfields in France, Germany, and the Low Countries, and industrial targets in France, Germany, and Belgium, making concentrated strikes on oil and transportation facilities after October 1944.

In addition to strategic missions, the 92d performed some interdictory and support operations. Assisted the Normandy invasion in June 1944 by hitting gun emplacements, junctions, and marshalling yards in the beachhead area. Supported ground forces at Saint-Lô during the breakthrough in July 1944. Bombed gun positions and bridges to aid the airborne assault on the Netherlands in September 1944. Participated in the Battle of the Bulge, December 1944 – January 1945, by attacking bridges and marshaling yards in and near the battle area. Bombed airfields near the landing zone to cover the airborne assault across the Rhine in March 1945.

After V-E Day, was assigned to Green Project which was the movement of troops from Marseilles staging area at Casablanca. Moved to Istres, France, between May and early July 1945. First personnel arrived on the third of June 1945. The 327th Bomb Squadron detached to Port Lyautey, French Morocco. Between 15 June 1945 and 9 September 1945 they moved 19,935 troops while 5,672 Frenchmen returned to France. The unit also flew displaced Greeks from Munich to Athens. The group run down during the winter of 1945 and 1946 were absorbed into the 306 BG on 28 February 1946.

== Strategic Air Command ==
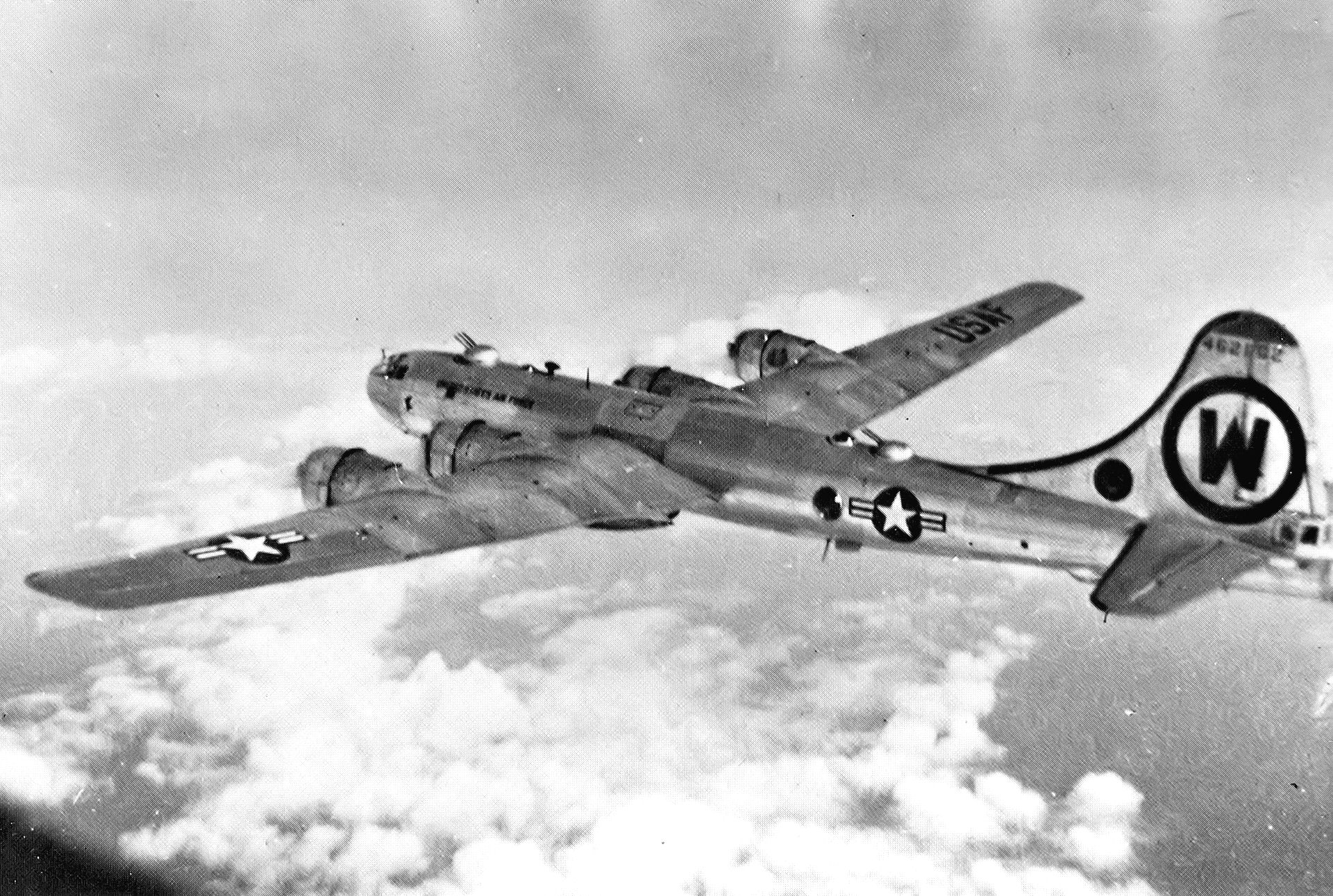
92d Bomb Group B-29A, AF Ser. No. 44-62102, "Wright's Delight" over the Sea of Japan on a Korean War bombing mission, July 1950

Reactivated later on 15 July 1946 for training in B-29 Superfortress bombers at Fort Worth Army Air Field. In October 1946 the 92 BG moved again, this time to Smokey Hill Army Air Field, Kansas where they remained until June 1947. The group's final move was to Spokane Army Air Field (now Fairchild Air Force Base) near Spokane, Washington. Elements deployed to alert commitments in the United Kingdom in early 1949.

The 92d was one of two Strategic Air Command (SAC) groups selected to deploy to the Pacific after SAC was directed to reinforce the 19th Bombardment Wing of Far East Air Forces. The 92d was selected because removing it from SAC control would have a minimum impact on the SAC mission because its planes were not yet equipped for the delivery of nuclear weapons and would not impact SAC's task of building a credible deterrent to the Soviet Union. During the early days of the Korean War, 92d BG B-29s arrived from the United States at Yokota Air Base, outside of Tachikawa, Japan, with deployment completed on 13 July. By the time the entire group completed its deployment, its aircraft had already flown a leaflet mission to Seoul and a combat mission against the Wonsan marshalling yards in North Korea. Under control of the FEAF Bomber Command (Provisional) until 20 October, the 92d bombed factories, refineries, iron works, hydroelectric plants, airfields, bridges, tunnels, troop concentrations, barracks, marshalling yards, road junctions, rail lines, supply dumps, docks, vehicles and other strategic and interdiction targets. The 92d BG returned to Spokane AFB, Washington in late October and November 1950. Five planes – AF Serial Numbers 44-61617, 44-61923, 44¬62084, 44-62211 and one serial number unknown – were lost during the deployment.

On 20 July 1951, the group began its conversion to the B-36 Peacemaker bomber. In June 1952, the unit was inactivated when the Air Force reorganized its wings into the tri-deputate system.

== Post Cold War era ==
On 29 August 1991, the 92d Bombardment Wing was redesignated as the 92d Wing under the "Objective Wing" concept adopted by the Air Force as the lines between tactical and strategic forces blurred. The flying components of the wing were reassigned to the newly established 92d Operations Group (92 OG), which inherited the lineage of the former 92d Bombardment Group.

As part of their new mission, the 92 OG also gained two squadrons of Boeing KC-135 Stratotanker aerial refueling aircraft. The 92d Air Refueling Squadron and the 43rd Air Refueling Squadron. The Group ended B-52 alert duties in September 1992, and from February 1993, performed air sampling missions for the United States Department of Energy with modified B-52Hs. The group's mission changed to solely air refueling in 1994. During 1993 the group also included the Bell UH-1-equipped 36th Rescue Flight, but this unit was gone by 1994 as were the B-52s.

The 92 OG regularly deployed elements during the late 1990s to support overseas tanker task forces in support of humanitarian, peacekeeping, and contingency operations in the Balkans and Southwest Asia. Today the 92d Operations Group is only responsible for KC-135 operations.

In 1999 the Group became the 92d Air Expeditionary Group at Morón Air Base in Spain, tasked with providing fuel to Operation Allied Force operations. In addition to serving as the HQ 92 AEG (serving units in France, Crete, Sicily and Spain), Morón hosted 37 tankers (KC-135 and KC-10) and 800 personnel. The 92 AEG became the largest aerial refueling wing since the Vietnam War and held the distinction of being the largest tanker base during the Kosovo War.

Aircraft of the 92 OG took part in the United States invasion of Afghanistan ("Operation Enduring Freedom") in 2001-02 and follow-on operations, and the 2003 invasion of Iraq. Today, elements of the 92d Operations Group are routinely deployed around the world.

The flying components of the 92 OG are equipped with the KC-135R Stratotankers. A black seahawk adorns the tails of the unit's aircraft. Today the group's components include:

- 92d Air Refueling Squadron
- 93d Air Refueling Squadron
- 97th Air Refueling Squadron
- 384th Air Refueling Squadron
- 92d Operations Support Squadron

== Lineage ==
- Established as 92d Bombardment Group (Heavy) on 28 January 1942

Activated on 1 March 1942
Redesignated 92d Bombardment Group, Heavy, on 20 August 1943
Inactivated on 28 February 1946

- Redesignated 92d Bombardment Group, Very Heavy, on 15 July 1946

Organized and activated, on 4 August 1946 from the personnel and equipment of the 448th Bombardment Group (Inactivated)
Redesignated: 92d Bombardment Group, Medium, on 28 May 1948
Redesignated: 92d Bombardment Group, Heavy, on 16 June 1951
Inactivated on 16 June 1952

- Redesignated 92d Operations Group on 29 August 1991

Activated on 1 September 1991.

== Assignments ==
- III Bomber Command, 1 March 1942
- VIII Bomber Command, August 1942

Attached to: 102d Provisional Combat Bombardment Wing, May 1943

- 40th Combat Bombardment Wing, 13 September 1943
- United States Air Forces in Europe, 9 July 1945 – 28 February 1946

Attached to: XII Tactical Air Command July 1945 – February 1946

- Fifteenth Air Force, 4 August 1946
- 92d Bombardment Wing, Very Heavy (later, 92d Bombardment Wing, Medium; 92d Bombardment Wing, Heavy), 17 November 1947 – 16 June 1952

Attached to FEAF Bombardment Command (Provisional), 8 July–October 1950

- 92d (later, 92d Bomb, 92d Air Refueling) Wing, 1 September 1991–present

== Components ==
=== World War II and Korean War ===
- 325th Bombardment Squadron (later, 325th Bomb) Squadron: 1 March 1942 – 28 February 1946; 4 August 1946 – 16 June 1952 (detached 16 February 1951 – 15 June 1952); 1 September 1991 – 1 July 1994

World War II fuselage code: NV; ACC tail code: FC

- 326th Bombardment Squadron: 1 March 1942 – 28 February 1946; 4 August 1946 – 16 June 1952 (detached 16 February 1951 – 15 June 1952)

World War II fuselage code: JW

- 327th Bombardment Squadron: 1 March 1942 – 28 February 1946; 4 August 1946 – 16 June 1952 (detached 16 February 1951 – 15 June 1952)

World War II fuselage code: UX

- 17th Reconnaissance (later, 407th Bombardment) Squadron: 1 March 1942 – 28 February 1946

World War II fuselage code: PY

=== From 1991 ===
- 36th Rescue Flight 1 July 1993 - 1 July 2012
- 43d Air Refueling Squadron: 1 September 1991 – 1 June 1992; 1 July 1994 – 31 March 1995
- 92d Air Refueling Squadron: 1 September 1991 – 1 June 1992; 1 July 1994–present
- 93d Air Refueling Squadron: 31 March 1995–present
- 96th Air Refueling Squadron: 1 July 1994 – 31 March 2005
- 97th Air Refueling Squadron: 1 July 1994 – 30 September 2004; 1 October 2019 – present
- 98th Air Refueling Squadron: 1 July 1994 – 1 July 1998
- 384th Air Refueling Squadron: 23 March 2017 – Present

== Stations ==
- Barksdale Field, Louisiana, 1 March 1942
- MacDill Field, Florida, 26 March 1942
- Sarasota Army Airfield, Florida, 18 May–July 1942
- RAF Bovingdon (AAF-112), England, August 1942
- RAF Alconbury (AAF-102), England, January 1943
- RAF Podington (AAF-109), England, 15 September 1943
- Istres Air Base, France, June 1945-28 February 1946
- Fort Worth Army Air Field, Texas, 4 August 1946
- Smoky Hill Army Air Field, Kansas, 25 October 1946
- Spokane AAFld (later, Spokane AFB; Fairchild AFB), Washington, 20 June 1947 – 16 June 1952

Operated from Yokota AB, Japan, 9 July-29 October 1950

- Fairchild AFB, Washington, 1 September 1991–present

== Aircraft assigned ==
- B-17 Flying Fortress, 1942–1946
- B-29 Superfortress, 1946–1952
- B-36 Peacemaker, 1951–1952
- B-52G Stratofortress, 1991–1994
- KC-135 Stratotanker, 1991–present
- UH-1 Huey, 1993.

== Bibliography ==
- Deaile, Melvin G. (2007). The SAC Mentality: The Origins of Organizational Culture in Strategic Air Command 1946-1962. Chapel Hill, NC: University of North Carolina.
- Futrell, Robert F. (1983). The United States Air Forces in Korea 1950-1953. Washington, DC: Office of Air Force History. ISBN 0-912799-71-4.

Part 1 Part 2 Part 3 Part 4

- Koger, Fred. Countdown: 35 Daylight Missions against Nazi Germany. Chapel Hill, North Carolina: Algolquin Books, 1990.
- Maurer, Maurer, ed. (1983) [1961]. Air Force Combat Units of World War II (reprint ed.). Washington, DC: Office of Air Force History. ISBN 0-912799-02-1. LCCN 61060979.
- Ravenstein, Charles A. (1984). Air Force Combat Wings, Lineage & Honors Histories 1947-1977. Washington, DC: Office of Air Force History. ISBN 0-912799-12-9.
- Sloan, John S. The Route as Briefed: the History of the 92d Bomb Group, USAAF, 1942–1945. Cleveland, Ohio: Argus Press, 1946. (Republished in 1976 by S. Wilson)
- 92d Bomb Group. 92d Bomb Group (H): "Fame's Favoured Few". Paducah, Kentucky: Turner Publishing, 1997. ISBN 1-56311-241-8.
