= 43rd Air Refueling Squadron =

Inactive US Air Force unit

43rd Air Refueling Squadron (later 43rd Expeditionary Air Refueling Squadron)
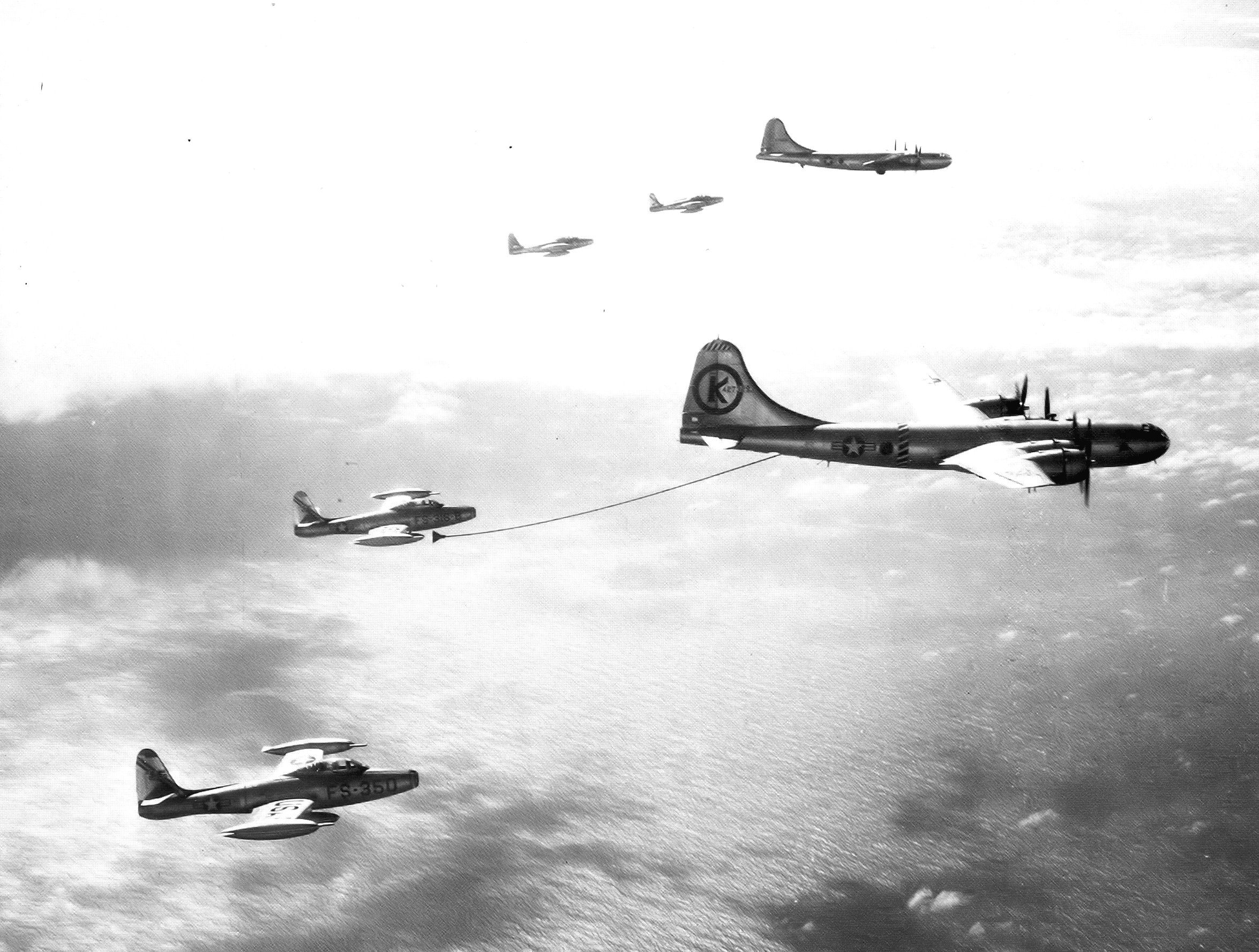
- 43d Air Refueling Squadron KB-29M Superfortresses refueling 48th Fighter Wing F-84G Thunderjets over the Philippines, 1953.
- Active: 1942–1943; 1948–1995
- Country: United States
- Branch: United States Air Force
- Role: Aerial refueling
- Motto(s): First Global Refuelers

Insignia
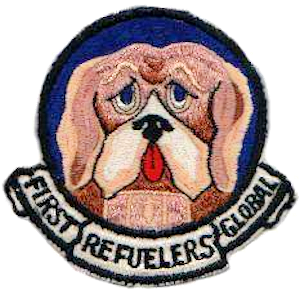
- Patch with 43d Air Refueling Squadron emblem

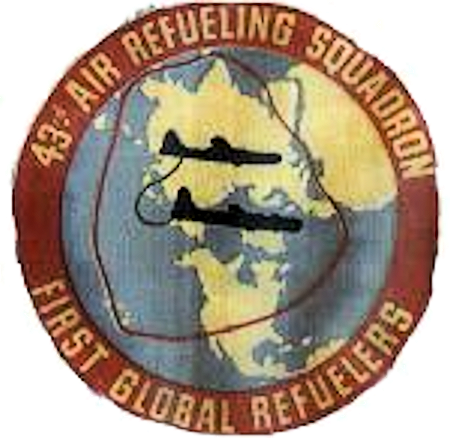
- Patch with early 43rd Air Refueling Squadron emblem

The 43d Air Refueling Squadron is an inactive United States Air Force unit. It was last assigned to the 92nd Bombardment Wing, stationed at Fairchild AFB, Washington. It was inactivated in 1995.

== History ==
=== Air Transport Command ===
Activated on 17 August 1942, the 43d Ferrying Squadron did not become operational at Accra Airport, British Gold Coast (now Ghana), Africa, until 4 December. As a unit of the 12th Ferrying Group, originally associated with the Air Corps Ferrying Command and the South Atlantic Ferry Route, the 43d delivered combat and transport aircraft to British forces in the Middle East and later to U.S. forces in North Africa, but its major task was the transport of high priority cargo and personnel within the theater and as far east as Karachi, India (now Pakistan). Redesignated 43d Transport Squadron in March 1943, it disbanded on 30 September 1943 during a reorganization of Air Transport Command units in North Africa.

=== Strategic Air Command ===
One of two refueling squadrons that the Strategic Air Command (SAC) activated on 12 July 1948, the 43d Air Refueling Squadron, Medium, was the USAF's first air refueling unit.

The squadron began operations in January 1949, flying KB-29M Superfortress tanker aircraft from Davis-Monthan Air Force Base, Arizona. The squadron refueled B-50s using the looped method developed by the British. In February 1949 supported the circumnavigation flight of the "Lucky Lady II", the first aircraft to fly non-stop around the world. During the Korean War, the 43d sent aircrews to Far East Air Forces to refuel fighter aircraft, at that time an experimental procedure. Deployed 21 March-5 June 1953 to RAF Lakenheath, England. In 1953, the 43d AREFS completed transition to new aircraft, the Boeing KC-97 Stratofreighter, equipped with the recently developed Boeing flying boom. Deployed 18 September-9 December 1954 to RAF Fairford, England.

While the 43d was still at Davis-Monthan, a new wing was being organized at Larson Air Force Base, Washington. Headquarters, 4170th Strategic Wing was organized and established at Larson on 1 July 1959 under the command of Lt Colonel Robert R. Johnston. Assisted by one master sergeant, the colonel's job was to pave the way for SAC's assumption of command of the base on 1 January 1960. The 4170th Wing was activated on 1 January 1960, with maintenance, support and medical units. Also on this date command of Larson was taken from Military Air Transport Service's 62nd Troop Carrier Wing. The 4170th Strategic Wing was a heavy bombardment organization to be equipped with Boeing B-52 Stratofortress bombers, Boeing KC-135 Stratotanker jet tankers and the HGM-25A Titan I intercontinental ballistic missiles at a later date. On 8 April 1960, Colonel Everett W. Best assumed command of the Wing. Under the command of Colonel Best, the 4170th SW became a functional unit of the Strategic Air Command on 13 July 1960 upon assignment of the 327th Bombardment Squadron's crews and aircraft. The 43d Air Refueling Squadron was assigned to the 4170th on 15 November 1960 and changed its suffix from "Medium" to "Heavy" in preparation for transition to the KC-135A. The 43d flew its last KC-97 mission in October 1960. The first crews of the 43d arrived on 19 March 1961 from Davis-Monthan, and the first of the KC-135's arrived on 24 March 1961.

With this new aircraft, 43d aircrews over the next few years refueled aircraft virtually everywhere in the world. Aircraft and crews deployed temporarily to Guam, Alaska, Greenland, Spain, England, Saudi Arabia, and Iraq. Colonel David A. Tate assumed command of the 4170th Strategic Wing in November 1961 and, on 1 February 1963, when the wing was redesignated the 462nd Strategic Aerospace Wing, Colonel Tate became the commander of the newly designated unit. The redesignation of the wing was part of the Air Force's program to honor former units with outstanding combat records. In August 1964, 43d aircrews deployed to Clark Air Base, Philippines, to begin supporting combat in Southeast Asia. Before terminating this refueling support in December 1975, the 43d AREFS dedicated substantial resources to the Vietnam War.

Colonel Alex W. Talmant assumed command of the 462nd Strategic Aerospace Wing upon the retirement of Colonel Tate on 31 July 1965. Under his command Larson was scheduled to be closed on 30 June 1966, with wing phase out scheduled to be complete by 25 June 1966.

On 2 April 1966, the 43d moved from Larson to Fairchild Air Force Base, Washington. In May–June 1980, the explosive volcanic eruption of Mount St. Helens forced the suspension of operations from Fairchild for a month, but the 43d operated four tankers each from Beale and Travis Air Force Bases, California. Once again, from 7 May to 8 August 1983, the squadron left Fairchild, deploying to Grant County Airport (the former Larson Air Force Base), while the Fairchild runway was repaired.

It was inactivated in 1995 as part of phasedown of USAF after the end of the Cold War.

=== Lineage ===
43d Transport Squadron

- Constituted as the 43d Ferrying Squadron on 9 July 1942

Activated on 17 August 1942
Redesignated 43d Transport Squadron on 24 March 1943
Disbanded on 30 September 1943

- Reconstituted, and consolidated (19 Sep 1985) with 43d Air Refueling Squadron, Heavy

43d Air Refueling Squadron
Constituted 43d Air Refueling Squadron, Medium on 30 June 1948
Activated on 19 July 1948
Redesignated 43d Air Refueling Squadron, Heavy on 15 November 1960
Inactivated on 31 March 1995

- Redesignated 43d Expeditionary Air Refueling Squadron and converted to provisional status on 12 June 2002

=== Assignments ===
- 12th Ferrying (later, 12th Transport) Group, 17 August 1942 – 30 September 1943
- 43d Bombardment Group, Medium, 19 July 1948 (attached to 43d Bombardment Wing after 10 February 1951)
- 43d Bombardment Wing, 16 June 1952 (attached to Eighth Air Force, 28 October-28 December 1955)
- 303rd Bombardment Wing, 1960
- 4170th Strategic Wing, 15 November 1960
- 462nd Strategic Aerospace Wing, 1 February 1963
- 92nd Strategic Aerospace Wing (later 92nd Bombardment Wing), 2 April 1966
- 92nd Operations Group, 1 September 1991
- 453rd Operations Group, 1 June 1992
- 92nd Air Refueling Wing, 1 July 1994 – 31 March 1995
- Air Mobility Command to activate or inactivate as needed, 12 June 2002

=== Stations ===
- Accra Airport, British Gold Coast, 17 August 1942 – 30 September 1943
- Davis-Monthan Air Force Base, Arizona, 19 July 1948 (deployed to RAF Lakenheath, England, 21 March-5 June 1953; RAF Fairford, England, 18 September-9 December 1954; Ernest Harmon Air Force Base, Newfoundland, 28 October-28 December 1955)
- Larson Air Force Base, Washington, 15 November 1960
- Fairchild Air Force Base, Washington, 2 April 1966 – 31 March 1995

=== Aircraft ===
- Various aircraft assigned for transport duties, 1942–1943
- Boeing B-29 Superfortress, 1948–1949
- Boeing KB-29M Superfortress, 1949–1953
- Boeing KC-97G Stratofreighter, 1953–1960
- Boeing KC-135 Stratotanker, 1961–1995
