= 36th Rescue Squadron =

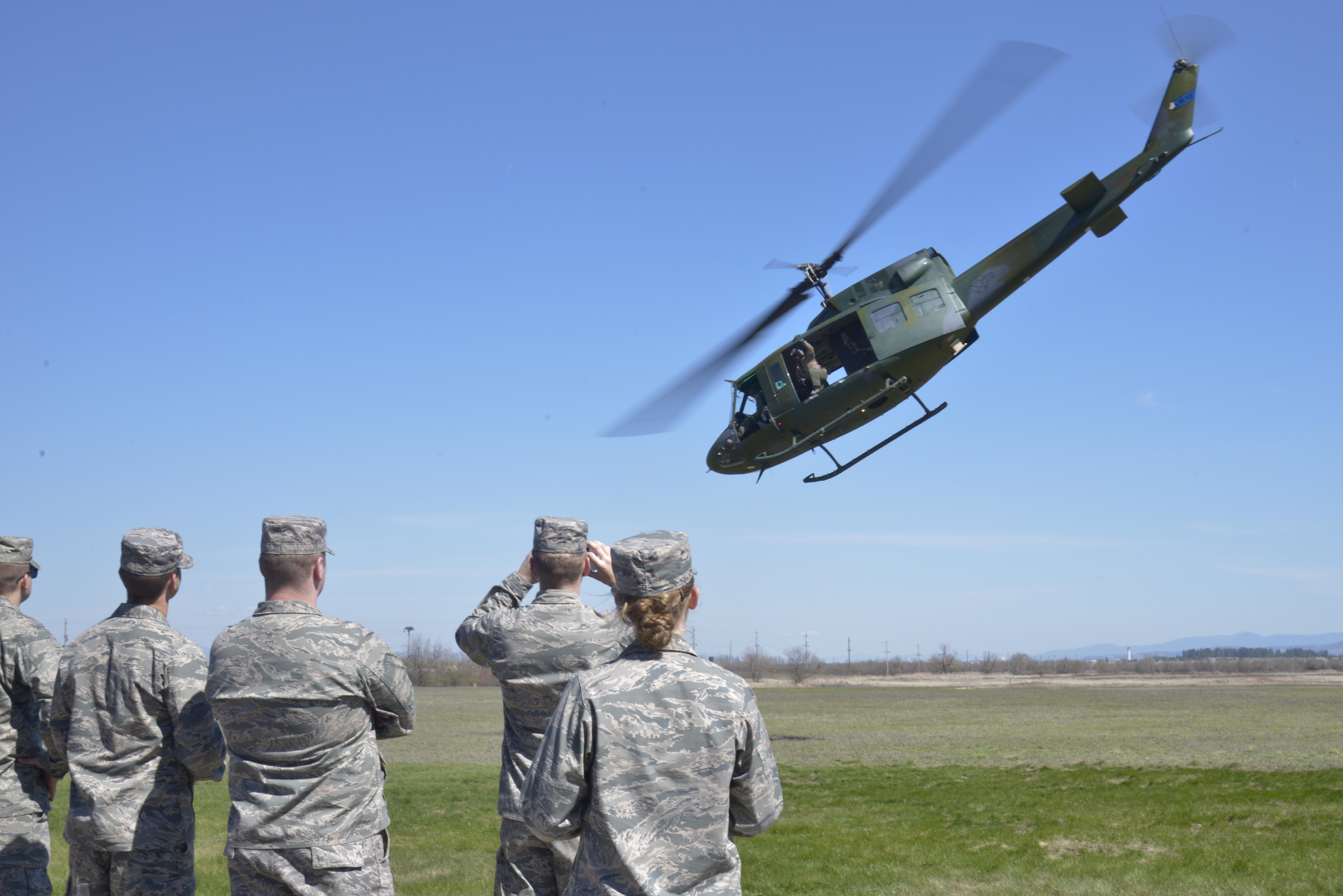
- AFROTC observe a 36th Rescue Flight UH-1N Iroquois demonstration during tour of the SERE School
- Active: 1952–1960; 1961–1972; 1993–present
- Country: United States
- Branch: United States Air Force
- Role: Training and Search and rescue
- Part of: Air Education and Training Command
- Garrison/HQ: Fairchild Air Force Base
- Engagements: Korean War
- Decorations: Distinguished Unit Citation; Navy Meritorious Unit Commendation; Air Force Outstanding Unit Award; Republic of Korea Presidential Unit Citation

Insignia
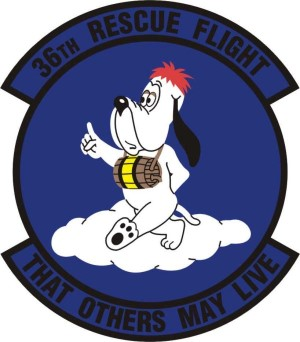
- 36th Rescue Flight emblem (approved 19 January 1959

The 36th Rescue Squadron at Fairchild Air Force Base, Washington is part of the 58th Operations Group. It was formerly part of the 336th Training Group at Fairchild. It operates Bell UH-1N Twin Huey aircraft conducting search and rescue missions in support of the US Air Force Survival School. The squadron was redesignated as the 36th Rescue Squadron on 14 August 2015.

The squadron was first activated in Japan during the Korean War and earned a Distinguished Unit Citation and a Republic of Korea Presidential Unit Citation for its rescue missions during that war. It continued rescue operations in the Northern Pacific until 1972, except for a brief inactive period from 1960 to 1961. The squadron has performed its current mission since activating in 1993 as the 36th Rescue Flight.

== Mission ==
The primary mission of the 36th Rescue Squadron is to support the USAF Survival School through helicopter operations, to support the National Search and Rescue Plan by providing assistance to local authorities, and to provide the Department of Defense with qualified crewmembers.

The 36th also conducts search and rescue and aeromedical evacuation missions in a four-state region, from the Cascades in Washington to the Rockies in western Montana. The unit has the only hoist-equipped aircraft and Night Vision Goggle-qualified aircrews in the Inland Northwest. It conducts missions at all times of day. Because of its area of responsibility, these are sometimes flown at high altitude, testing the edges of the squadron's Hueys in areas inaccessible by ground vehicle.

== History ==
=== Rescue in the Pacific ===
The squadron was first activated as the 36th Air Rescue Squadron in November 1952, when Air Rescue Service expanded its existing rescue squadrons into groups and replaced their flights with new squadrons. The 36th assumed the mission, personnel and equipment of Flight A of the 3d Air Rescue Squadron, which became the 3d Air Rescue Group. The 36th flew combat search and rescue missions in the Korean War from activation until hostilities ended in July 1953, earning a Distinguished Unit Citation and a Republic of Korea Presidential Unit Citation. It continued to conduct search, rescue, and recovery missions in Japan and the waters around Japan until November 1972, except for the period from September 1961 to June 1962, when it was inactive. The squadron was renamed the 36th Air Recovery Squadron in April 1965, and the 36th Aerospace Rescue and Recovery Squadron in January 1966.

=== Survival training support ===
In May 1993 the squadron was activated at Fairchild Air Force Base, Washington as the 36th Rescue Flight, when it replaced the 48th Rescue Squadron. It has operated helicopters for survival training since then, first operating under Fairchild's host wing's 92d Operations Group, then as part of the 336th Crew Training Group, which operates the survival school. It was expanded into the 36th Rescue Squadron in August 2015 and now reports to the 58th Operations Group, located at Kirtland Air Force Base, New Mexico.

In its role as a rescue unit, the squadron typically responds to between 15 and 20 calls for help annually, including searches conducted for lost aircraft and straying hikers. It has also evacuated people threatened by wildfires. The unit and its predecessor have been credited with rescuing 689 people since 1971 as of August 2015.

== Lineage ==
- Constituted as the 36th Air Rescue Squadron on 17 October 1952

Activated on 14 November 1952
Discontinued and inactivated on 18 September 1960
[Activated and] organized on 18 June 1961
Redesignated 36th Air Recovery Squadron on 1 July 1965
Redesignated 36th Aerospace Rescue and Recovery Squadron on 8 January 1966
Inactivated on 30 November 1972

- Redesignated 36th Rescue Flight on 1 April 1993

Activated on 1 May 1993
Redesignated 36th Rescue Squadron on 14 August 2015

=== Assignments ===
- 3d Air Rescue Group, 14 November 1952
- 2d Air Rescue Group, 18 June 1957 (attached to Fifth Air Force for operational control)
- Air Rescue Service, 24 June 1958 – 18 September 1960 (attached to Fifth Air Force for operational control)
- Air Rescue Service (later Aerospace Rescue and Recovery Service), 18 June 1961 (attached to Fifth Air Force for operational control)
- Pacific Aerospace Rescue and Recovery Center (later 41st Aerospace Rescue and Recovery Wing), 1 April 1967 – 30 November 1972
- 92d Operations Group, 1 May 1993
- 336th Crew Training Group (later 336 Training Group), 1 July 1993
- 58th Operations Group, 1 July 2012
- 336th Training Group, 15 April 2014
- 58th Operations Group, 14 August 2015 – present

=== Stations ===
- Johnson Air Base, Japan, 14 November 1952
- Tachikawa Air Base, Japan, 25 June–18 September 1960
- Tachikawa Air Base, Japan, 18 June 1961
- Yokota Air Base, Japan, 1 December 1969
- Kadena Air Base, Okinawa, 11–30 November 1972
- Fairchild Air Force Base, Washington, 1 May 1993 – present

=== Aircraft ===
- Grumman SA-16 Albatross (1952–1960)
- Sikorsky H-19 Chickasaw (1952–1960)
- Douglas C-47 Skytrain (1952–1956)
- Douglas C-54 Skymaster (1955–1960)
- Douglas SC-54 Rescuemaster (1961–1966)
- Sikorsky SH-19 (later HH-19) (1961–1964)
- Kaman HH-43 Huskie (1964–1965)
- Lockheed HC-130 Hercules (1966–1972)
- UH-1N Iroquois (1993–present)
