= Bell UH-1N Twin Huey =

Utility transport helicopter

UH-1N Iroquois CH-135 Twin Huey
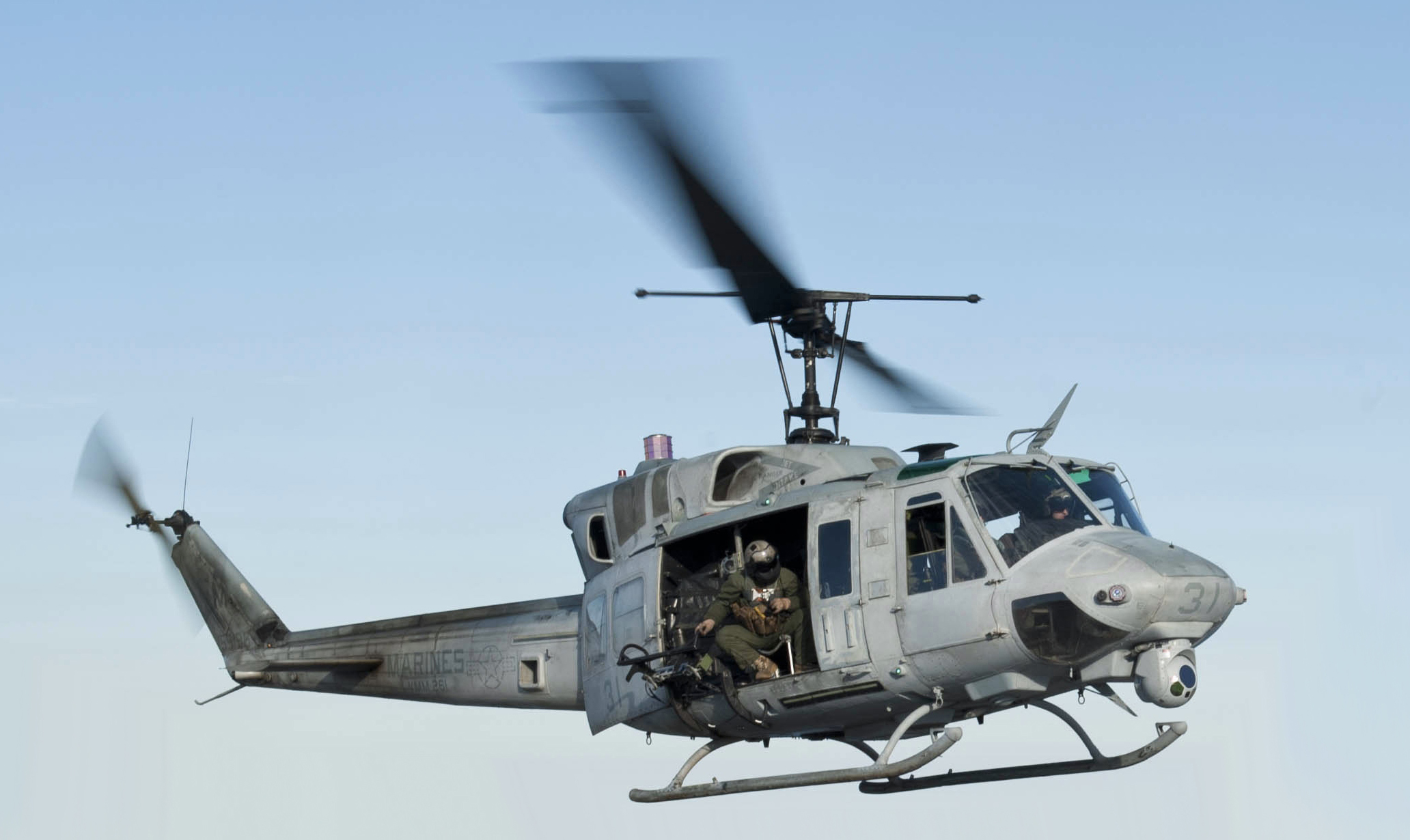
- A UH-1N "Huey" from squadron VMM-261, (Reinforced), 2012

General information
- Type: Utility helicopter
- National origin: United States / Canada
- Manufacturer: Bell Helicopter
- Status: In service
- Primary users: United States Air Force United States Marine Corps (historical); Canadian Forces (historical); United States Navy (historical)

History
- Manufactured: 1969–1970s
- Introduction date: October 1970
- First flight: April 1969
- Developed from: Bell UH-1H Iroquois
- Variants: Bell 212; Bell 412; Bell UH-1Y Venom

The Bell UH-1N Twin Huey is a medium military helicopter designed and produced by the American aerospace manufacturer Bell Helicopter. It is a member of the extensive Huey family. The initial version was the CUH-1N Twin Huey, later CH-135 Twin Huey, which was first ordered by the Canadian Forces in 1968.

Barely a year following initial discussions, the UH-1N performed its maiden flight in April 1969. Its procurement by the US military was initially controversial due to the high level of Canadian content, such as its Pratt & Whitney Canada PT6T turboshaft engines. However, the acquisition was approved and the Twin Huey was quickly delivered to the United States Air Force and sent to front line combat units in Vietnam in October 1970. In 1971, the Canadian Forces, United States Marine Corps, and the United States Navy all received their first examples. Bell was quick to adapt the Twin Huey into a civilian helicopter, the Bell 212, and the later Bell 412.

The Twin Huey saw service in numerous conflicts, the first being the Vietnam War, where they were commonly used to support Special Forces reconnaissance missions. On the home front, they were used as the main utility helicopter at ICBM launch sites, and were executive transports for carrying the US president and other high-ranking officials by Marine Helicopter Squadron One. USMC UH-1Ns were active during the 2003 invasion of Iraq, providing reconnaissance, communications, and close air support to ground forces. Overseas, UH-1Ns participated in the Colombian armed conflict and the Falklands War. In the 2010s and 2020s, multiple operators were in the process of replacing the Twin Huey with newer helicopters, such as the Bell UH-1Y Venom, a development of the UH-1N, and the AgustaWestland AW139.

== Development ==
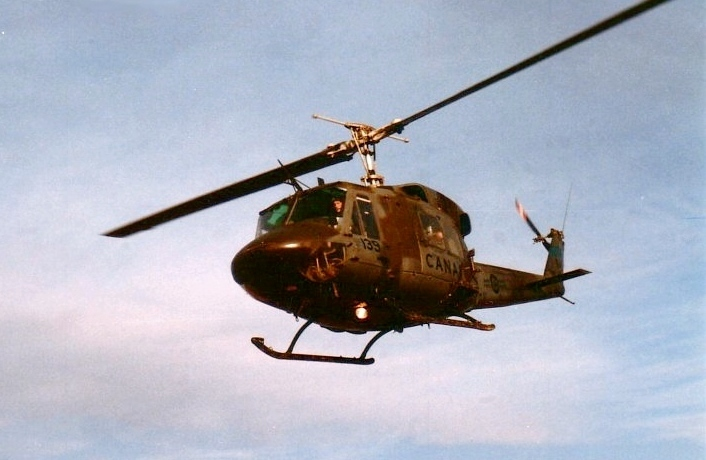
A Canadian CH-135 Twin Huey serving with 408 Tactical Helicopter Squadron, 1985

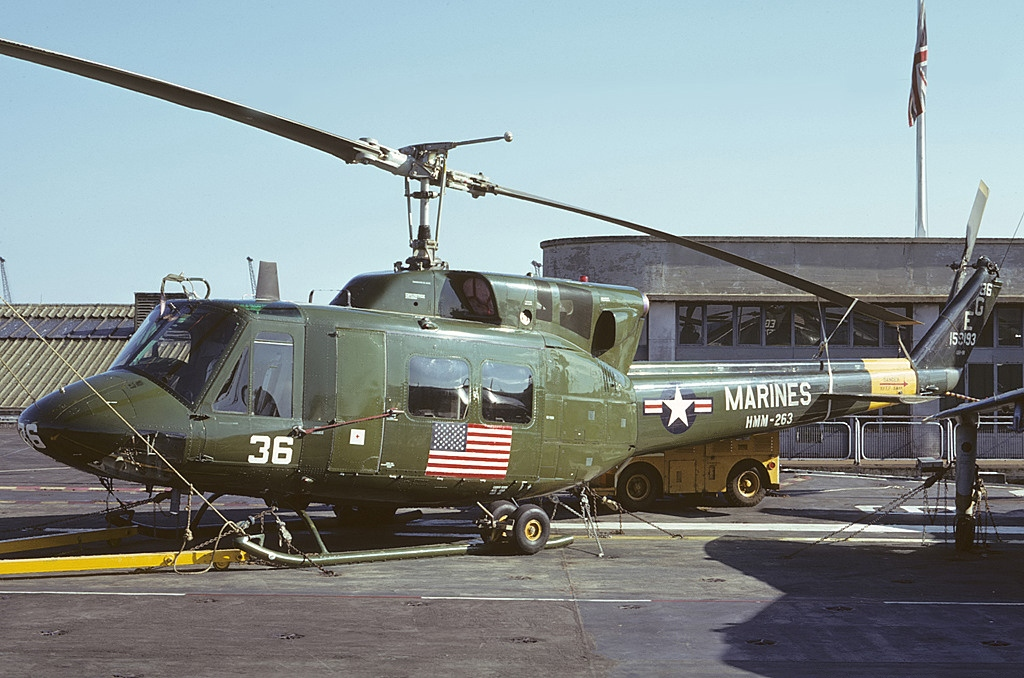
A U.S. Marine Corps UH-1N in 1974

The UH-1N was developed out of negotiations between the Canadian Forces (CF) and Bell Helicopter on the topic of a new utility helicopter in 1968. The CF wanted it to be based on the stretched-fuselage Bell 205, which the service already had experience of, but instead powered by a pair of engines for a higher level of safety. The selection of this engine, the Pratt & Whitney Canada PT6T turboshaft engine, was reportedly due to political factors. Its initial designation was CUH-1N Twin Huey. Later, the CF adopted a new designation system under which the rotorcraft was redesignated CH-135 Twin Huey. The CF approved the development of the rotorcraft on 1 May 1968. 50 CH-135s were procured, the deliveries of which commenced in May 1971.

The US military quickly took an interest in the UH-1N and some officials were keen to quickly procure the type, yet the procurement came close to not happening. It was opposed by the chairman of the House Armed Services Committee at the time, L. Mendel Rivers, who disliked that the UH-1N's Pratt & Whitney Canada PT6T engines were produced in Canada. The Liberal Canadian government of the time had not supported US involvement in Vietnam and had also opposed US policies in Southeast Asia, as well as accepting US draft dodgers. Rivers was also concerned that procuring the engines would result in a trade deficit situation with Canada. Congress finally approved the Twin Huey purchase when it was assured that a US source would be found for the PT6T/T400 engines. For this purpose, Pratt & Whitney opened a new assembly plant in Bridgeport, West Virginia. With the purchase permitted, the various services of the U.S. military ordered a total 294 Bell 212s under the designation UH-1N, with deliveries commencing in 1970.

Having secured multiple military customers, Bell Helicopters became interested in developing a commercial utility model for the civilian market; during 1971, type certification was given to the Bell 212 by the Federal Aviation Administration (FAA). Later on, homologation was obtained for instrument flight rules (IFR) operations, for which appropriate avionics were fitted. During 1977, the company certified the Bell 212 for single-pilot IFR operations, making it the first helicopter in the world to obtain such certification.

Another key opportunity was the European market. Bell negotiated with the Italian helicopter manufacturer Agusta to produce the AB-212 under license. This model, the first examples of which was delivered in 1971, was broadly the same as their American-built counterparts, and were produced for both civilian and military operators. In 1976, the AB-212ASW, an anti-submarine warfare-orientated model, commenced production.

The Bell 412 is a further development of the Bell 212, the major difference being the composite four-blade main rotor. The UH-1N has been developed into the upgraded, four-blade UH-1Y, which was developed to replace the UH-1N in USMC service.

== Design ==
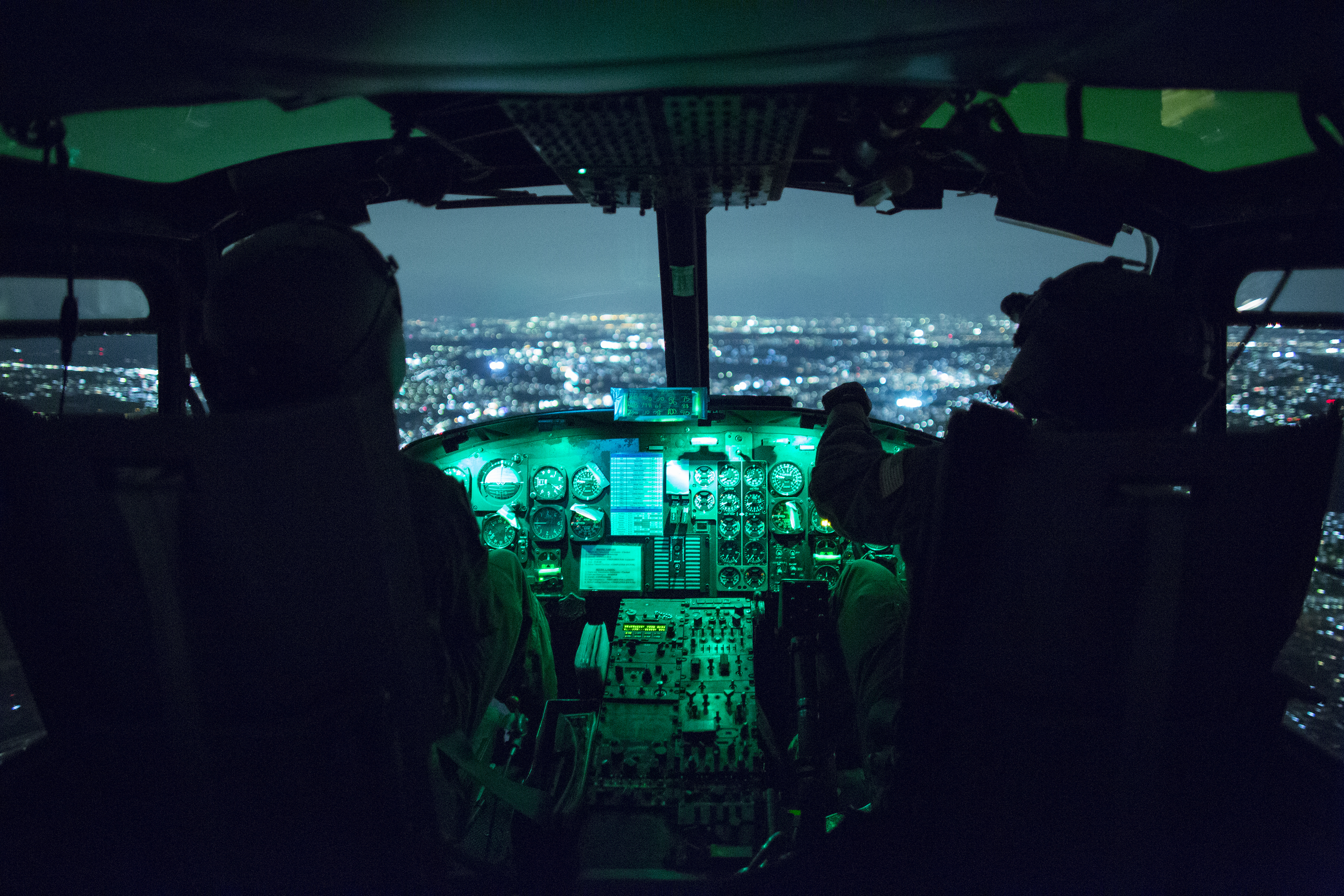
Nighttime cockpit view during the military exercise Iron Fist, 2015

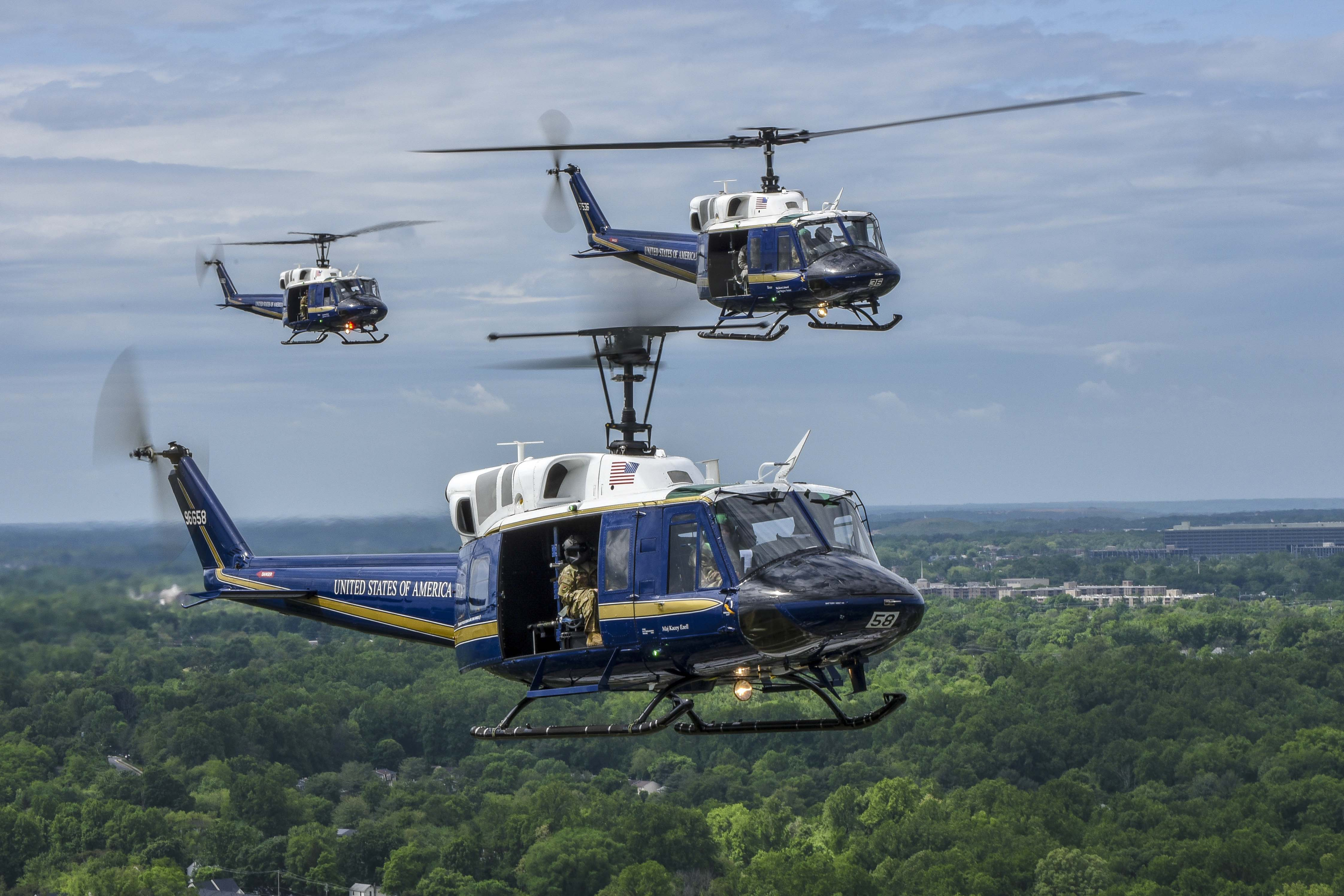
Trio of UH-1N in 2019

The Bell UH-1N Twin Huey is a twin-engined medium-sized military helicopter primarily operated as a utility transport. Power is provided by a PT6T-3/T400 Turbo Twin Pac, comprising a pair of Pratt & Whitney Canada PT6 turboshaft engines mounted side by side and driving a shared gearbox and single output shaft. These engines are capable of producing up to 1,342 kW (1,800 shp). In the event of a single power section failing, the remaining section can deliver 671 kW (900 shp) for up to 30 minutes or 571 kW (765 shp) continuously, enabling the UH-1N to maintain cruise performance at maximum weight. It is capable of flight under instrument flight rules and in nighttime conditions.

The UH-1N is often flown with a four-person crew, comprising two pilots and two crew chiefs; while in the air, these crew chiefs man the weapons, while one pilot functions as a navigator and the other actively flies. The interior is normally outfitted with a 15-seat configuration, in which it can be flown by a single pilot and carry up to 14 passengers; in practice, rarely could the UH-1N actually carry this many unless also carrying limited fuel and equipment due to weight limitations and weather conditions.

When configured to carry cargo, the cabin has an internal capacity of 220 ft³ (6.23 m³). Up to six litters can be carried in a medical evacuation arrangement. An external load of up to 5,000 lb (2,268 kg) can also be carried. In United States Marine Corps (USMC) service, up to three radios would be installed in the cabin so that commanders could remain airborne while coordinating ground troops. The UH-1N was normally armed with a single .50 caliber machine gun on the helicopter's left side, while a 7.62 millimeter machine gun is mounted on the right side.

To improve safety, a high level of redundancy is present across the UH-1N's key systems; these include duplicate hydraulic, electrical, and fuel systems. Fire suppression systems were also installed. The USMC opted to modify a large number of their UH-1Ns with a stability control augmentation system, which provides servo inputs to the rotor head to help stabilize the aircraft during flight. This modification removed the gyroscopic "stabilization bar" on top of the main rotor head, instead relying on the computer system for stability.

== Operational history ==
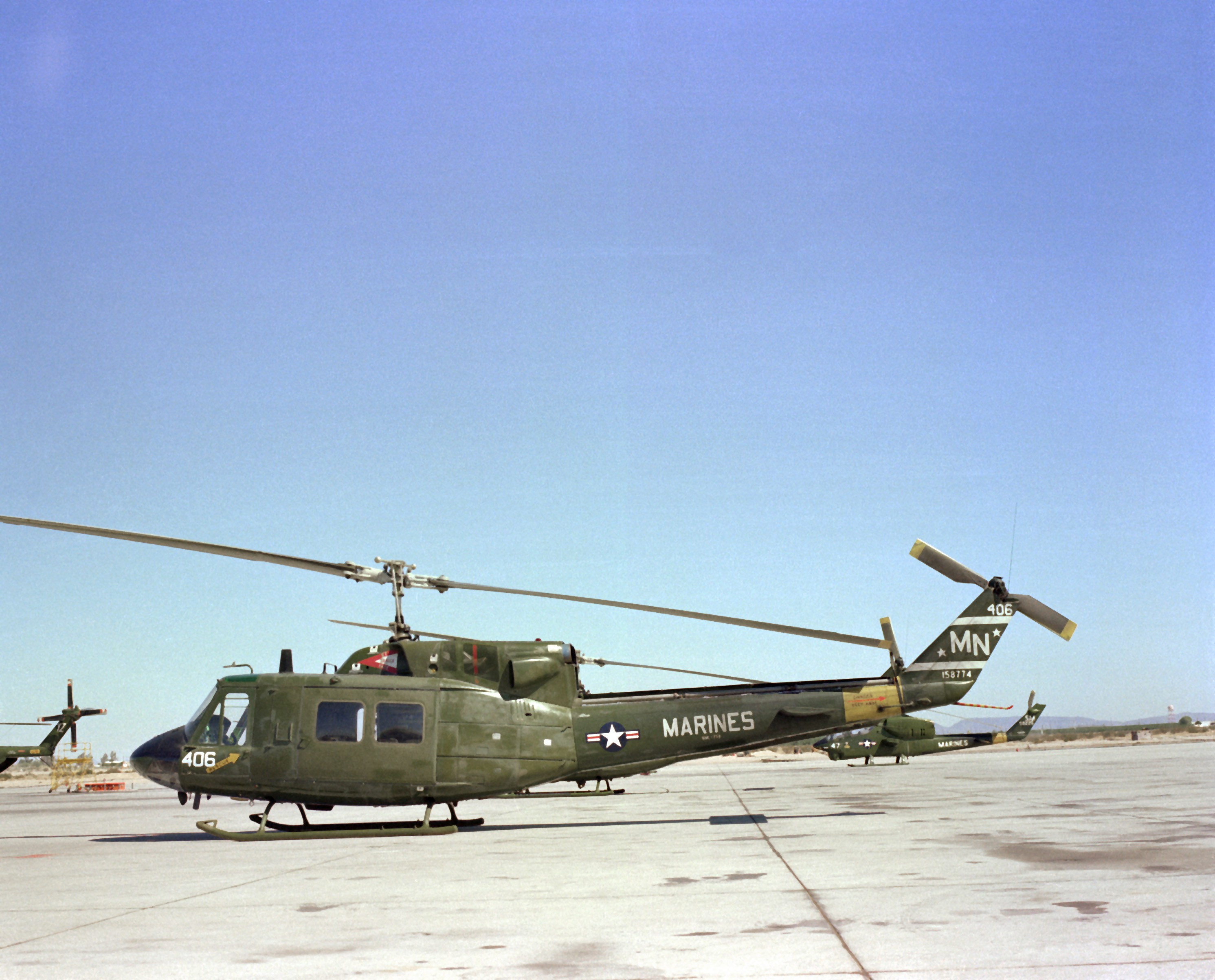
A Marine UH-1N on the flight line at NAS Whiting Field, Florida, 1982

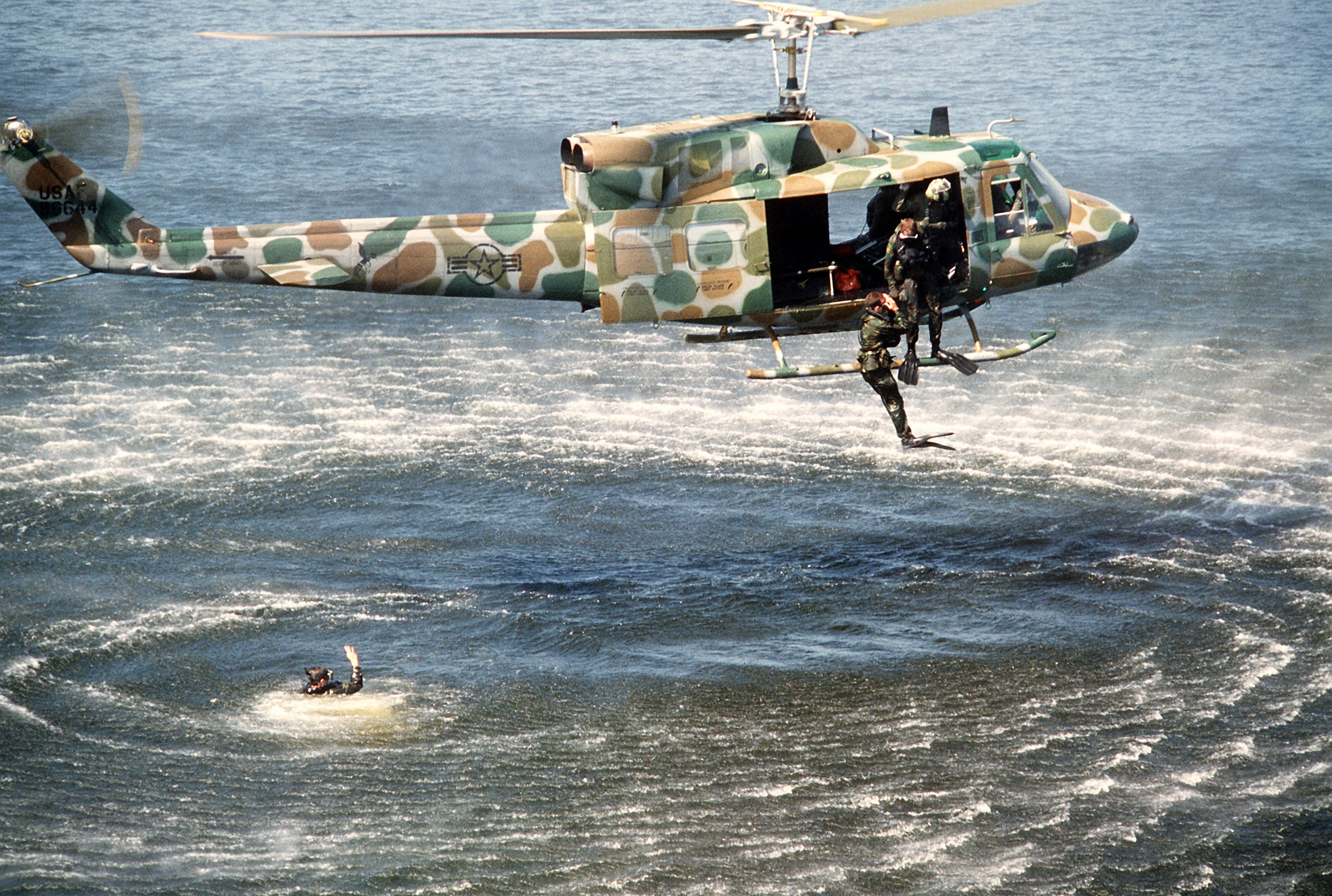
Special operations train using a UH-1N, 1983

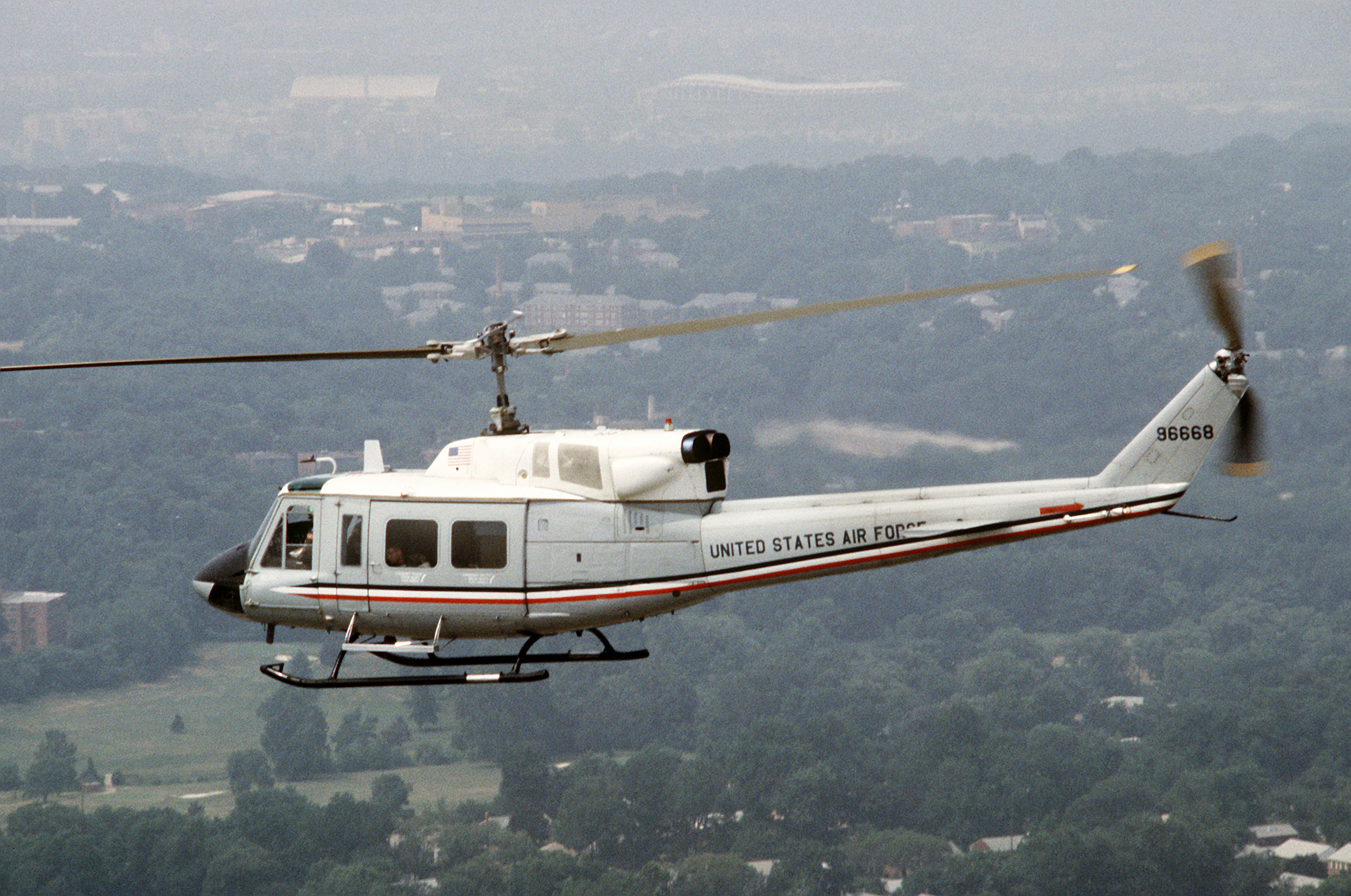
A USAF UH-1N during Exercise Wounded Eagle '83

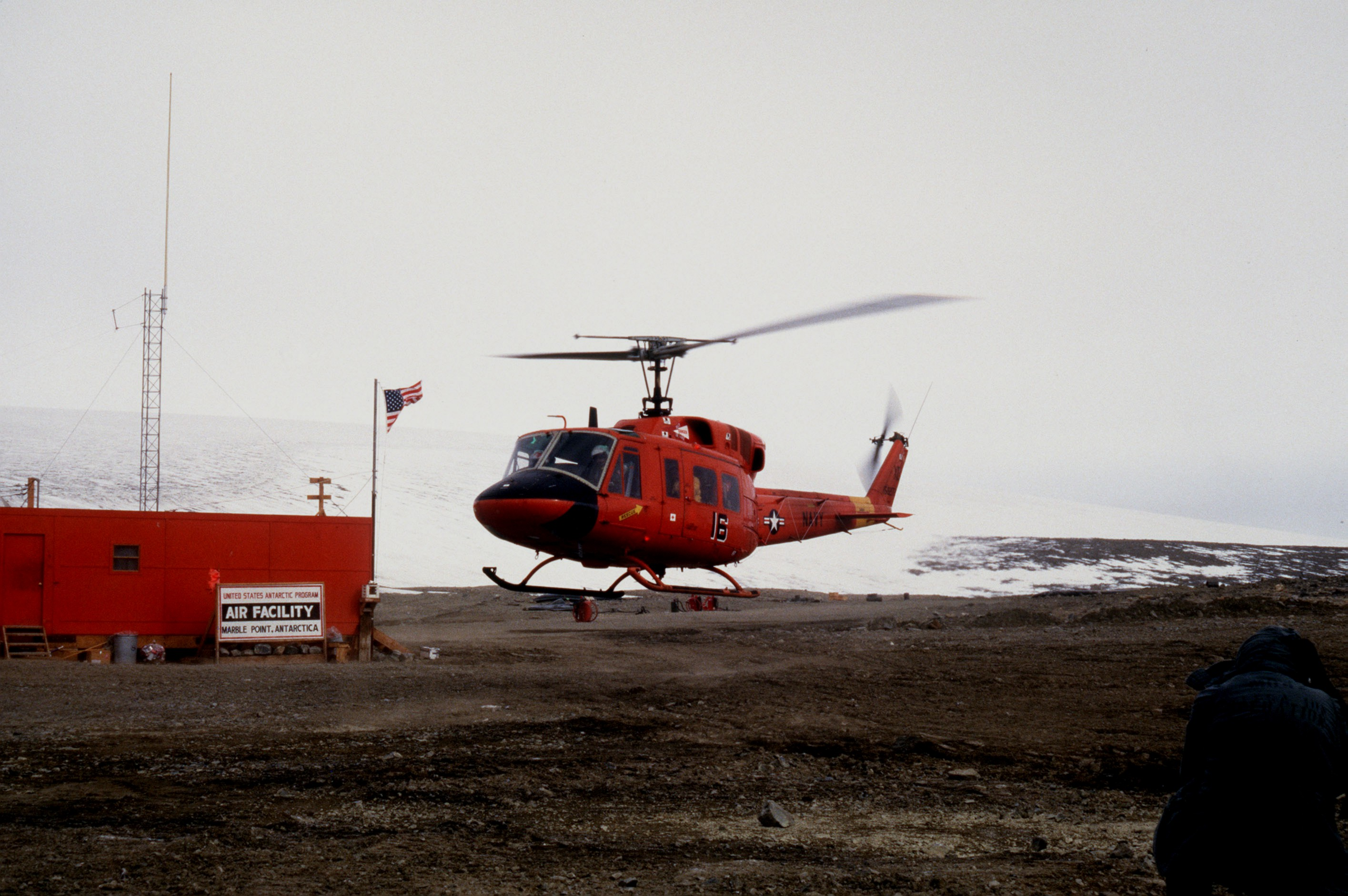
UH-1N in the Antarctic, 1988

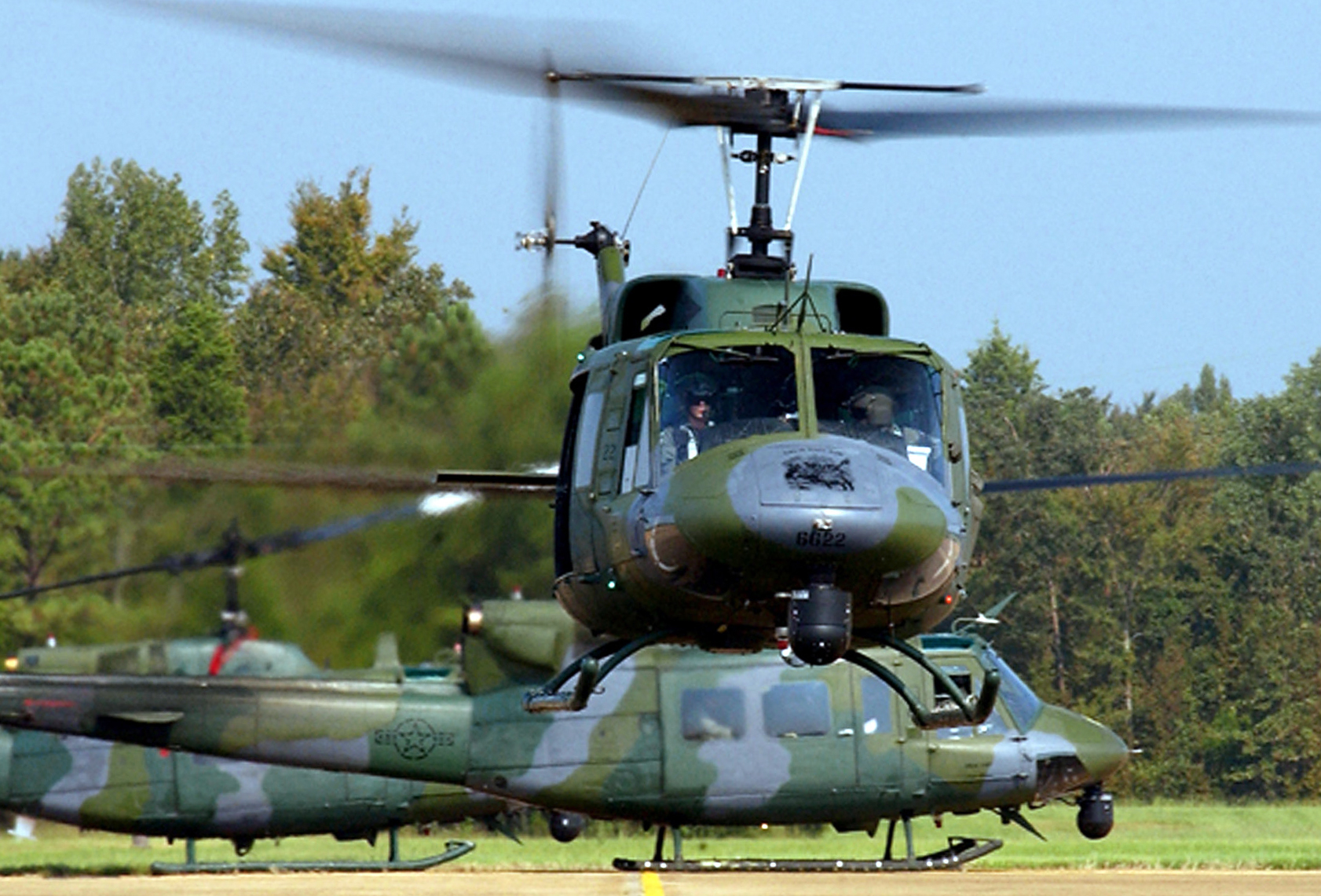
UH-1N deploy for Hurricane Katrina relief efforts

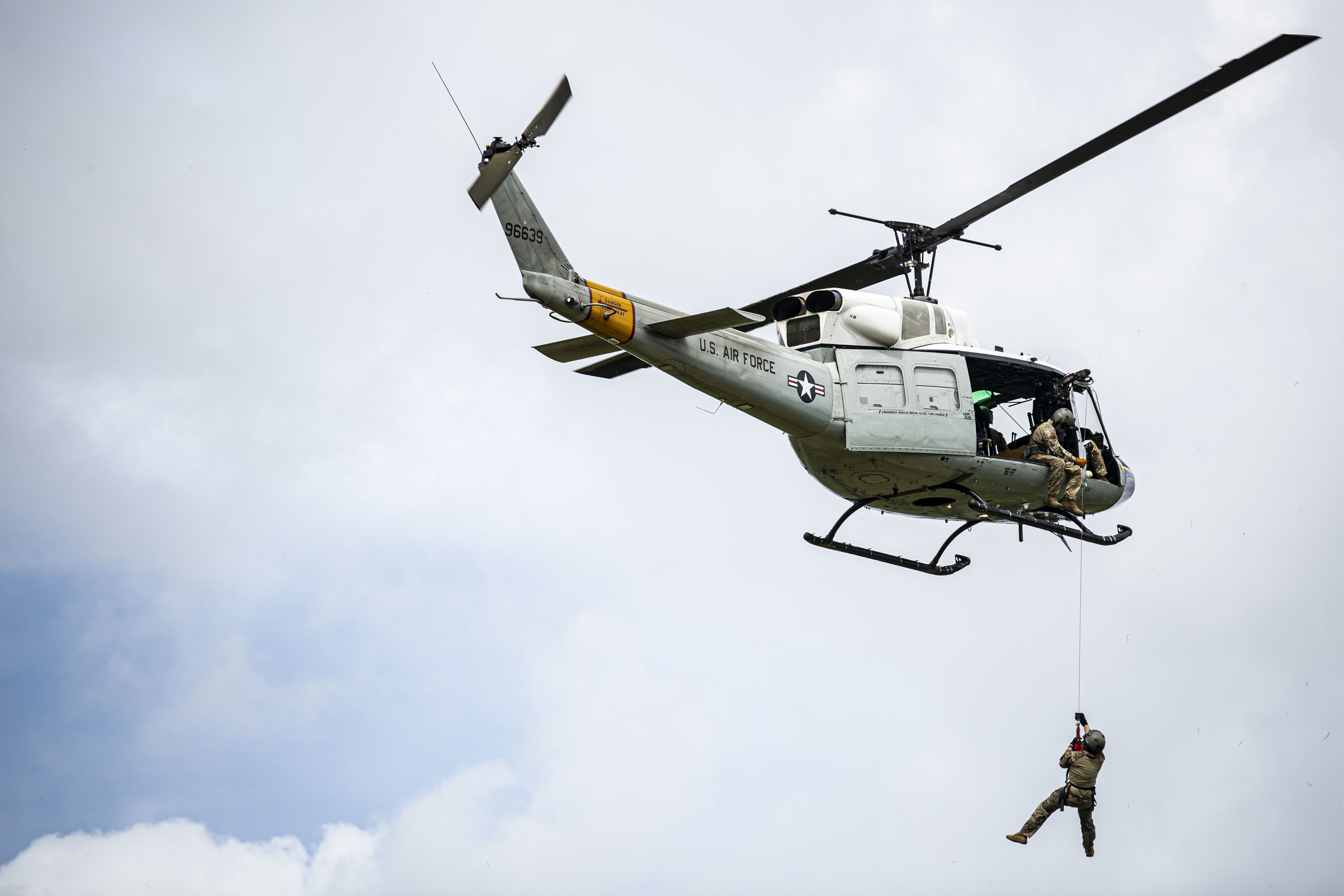
Hoisting exercise in 2022

Starting in late 1970, mere months after receiving its first deliveries of the type, the USAF begun to re-equip the 20th Special Operations Squadron in Vietnam with UH-1Ns, supplementing and eventually replacing the single-engined UH-1F and UH-1P. Armed with miniguns (or 40 mm grenade launchers) and rocket pods, and painted camouflage with no US markings and only a Green Hornet insignia, the UH-1N supported Special Forces reconnaissance missions from Cam Ranh Bay.

The first deliveries of the UH-1N to the U.S. Navy and USMC took place in 1971. In total, 205 UH-1Ns would be received, not including six VH-1N executive transports that were used to carry the US president and other high-ranking officials, operated by Marine Helicopter Squadron One. Unlike in the CF, in US service, the UH-1N retained the official name "Iroquois" from the single–engined UH-1 variants, although US service personnel refer to the aircraft as a "Huey" or "Twin Huey".

In Canadian service, the CH-135 Twin Huey was regularly used as a tactical transport, moving troops and equipment around the forward areas of a combat zone; medevac flights were also conducted. Further activities included VIP transport, search and rescue, and drug interdiction missions. CH-135s were deployed on multiple occasions to support United Nations peacekeeping missions in various regions, including Central America, Somalia, and Haiti.

The Argentine Air Force acquired eight Bell 212s during 1978. During the 1982 Falklands War, Argentina deployed a pair of Bell 212s to the airstrip at Goose Green where they performed general support duties, including the recovery of numerous downed pilots. By the end of the hostilities, both aircraft were still intact and flightworthy, but were captured and dismantled by the British troops.

From October 5-7 of 1982, one UH-1N of the US Navy was sent to Chesapeake Bay for testing aboard the container ship MA-257 Export Leader which had been modified with a flight deck in accordance with the Arapaho Containerized Aircraft Handling System. Along with a variety of other naval helicopters, there were a total of 178 day and 45 night landings, some of which were conducted simultaneously, or with embarked British officers aboard. While these tests were successful in proving the viability of the system, the Navy ultimately decided not to continue further with the program.

USMC UH-1Ns were deployed during the 2003 invasion of Iraq; they were typically used to provide reconnaissance and communications support to ground troops. Multiple UH-1Ns were called upon to provide close air support during heavy fighting in the Battle of Nasiriyah. In comparison with the Bell AH-1 Cobra attack helicopter, the UH-1N had a wider field of fire with its weapons and thus played a useful role in close combat situations, commonly working in conjunction with Cobras.

The USAF employs the aging UH-1Ns to fulfill its ICBM mission, providing a utility helicopter for transport between bases such as Minot AFB, Francis E. Warren AFB and Malmstrom AFB to missile launch sites in North Dakota, Montana, Wyoming, Nebraska, and Colorado. The UH-1N is also used by the 36th Rescue Squadron (36 RQS) at Fairchild AFB, Washington, for conducting search-and-rescue and medical evacuation missions, as well as the 459th Airlift Squadron based at Yokota Air Base in Japan.

In August 2013, the USAF said they were close to finalizing a plan to sustain and modernize their UH-1Ns for the next six to ten years. It was intended to address flight and safety mandates, investigate modest improvements in capabilities, and reduce capability gaps. While the UH-1N had become one of the oldest platforms operated by the service, retaining it was viewed as having "minimal risk". Fleet-wide upgrades included night vision-compatible cockpit lighting, crash-worthy seats for flight engineers, and installation of a terrain-awareness warning system and traffic collision-avoidance device. The USAF was also in the process of acquiring ex-USMC UH-1Ns, possibly involving as many as 26 helicopters to either add them to USAF's active fleet or keep them in reserve.

The UH-1N saw combat service in the Colombian armed conflict. On 16 October 2013, a UH-1N crashed in the northern La Guajira department in a FARC-dominated area.

The USMC planned to retire the UH-1N by September 2014 after 43 years of service. Marine Light Attack Helicopter Squadron 773 was the last Marine squadron operating the type, their last deployment occurring in 2013, when two helicopters sailed on a Royal Netherlands Navy ship for an African Partnership Station deployment. The UH-1N was replaced by the upgraded UH-1Y Venom; ten are remanufactured UH-1N airframes, after which the USMC decided to procure newly built airframes instead. By 2014, five unarmed HH-1Ns remained in use by the USMC until these were also replaced by UH-1Ys and retired in 2015, the only HH-1Ns remaining from 44 that were converted from 38 UH-1Ns and the six VH-1Ns. The final combat deployment of USMC UH-1Ns was to Afghanistan in 2010. The service retired the UH-1N during a "sundown ceremony" at Naval Air Station Joint Reserve Base New Orleans on 28 August 2014.

By March 2013, the USAF operated 62 UH-1N Twin Hueys, with 25 providing security at ICBM sites, 19 stationed at Joint Base Andrews to evacuate Washington-based government officials in emergencies, and 18 used for testing and training. Since most were purchased in 1969, the USAF had sought a replacement. The first requirements were issued in 2007, but the process was repeatedly delayed. On 24 September 2018, the USAF declared the Boeing MH-139 Grey Wolf (their variant of the AgustaWestland AW139) the winner, beating out the Sikorsky/Lockheed Martin HH-60U Black Hawk and the Sierra Nevada Corporation upgraded UH-60L Force Hawk. Notably, the Grey Wolf also uses the PT6, albeit a different variant. Boeing was awarded an initial $375 million contract for four MH-139s, with 84 helicopters planned at a total $2.38 billion program cost. Initial deliveries were planned for 2021.

== Variants ==
=== Canadian variants ===
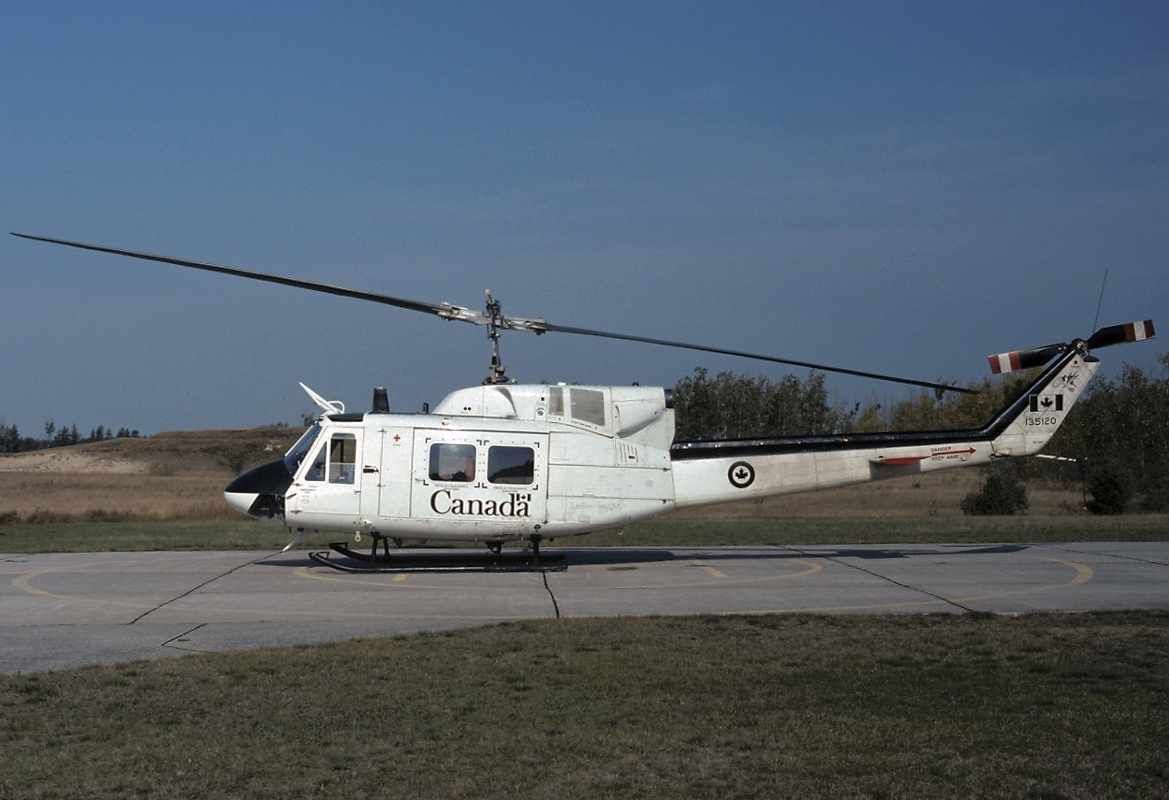
A CH-135 Twin Huey of Canada

CUH-1N Twin Huey
Original Canadian Armed Forces designation for the UH-1N utility transport helicopter.
CH-135 Twin Huey
Canadian version of the UH-1N. Canada purchased 50 CH-135s with deliveries starting in 1971. Two aircraft were lost during the period it was in service with CAF. The aircraft were retired from the Canadian Forces starting in 1996 and struck off strength in December 1999. 41 of the surviving CH-135s were acquired by the US government in December 1999. Two are displayed at museums in Canada. The 41 surviving were transferred to the National Army of Colombia and Colombian National Police. At least one CH-135 was destroyed in combat. 135135 was transferred to the Colombian National Police and flown by the Dirección Antinarcóticos (DIRAN). It was destroyed on the ground by FARC rebels in January 2002, following an incident in which it was forced down by gunfire. Two CH-135s are on display in museums, one at the Canada Aviation Museum in Ottawa and one at the National Air Force Museum of Canada at CFB Trenton.

=== U.S. variants ===
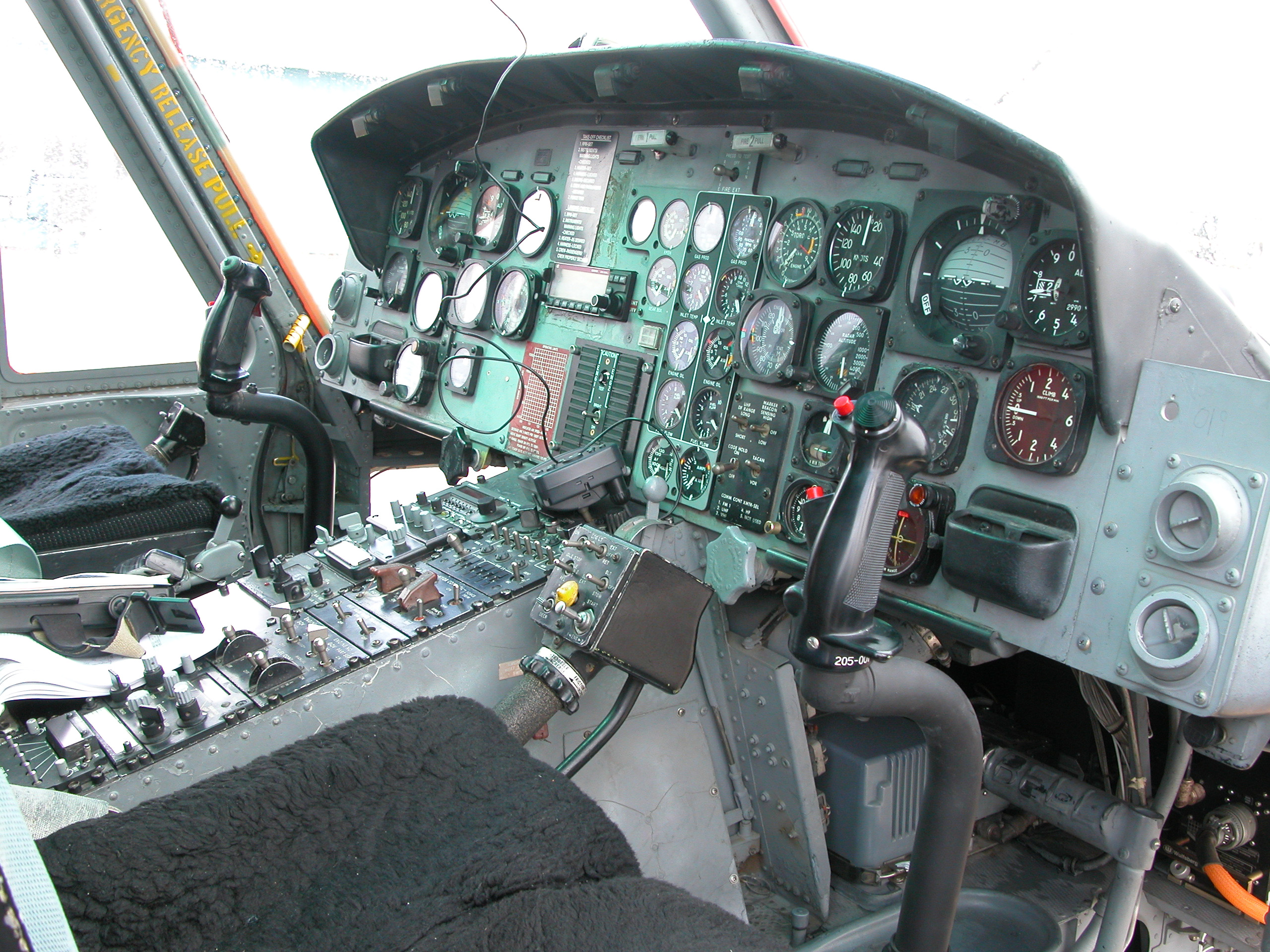
A U.S. Navy HH-1N cockpit

UH-1N Iroquois
Initial production model, used by the USAF, USN, and USMC. Over the years, the primary operators, the USMC has developed upgrades for the aircraft, including improved avionics, defenses, and a FLIR turret. The USAF planned to replace their UH-1Ns with the Common Vertical Lift Support Platform to support the service's ICBM activities, and examined a life extension for their current fleet.
VH-1N
VIP transport configuration
HH-1N
SAR variant.
UH-1Y Venom
A UH-1N replacement and upgrade as part of the H-1 upgrade program for the USMC, designed to coincide with a similar upgrade for the AH-1W attack helicopter to AH-1Z Viper standard, with common engines and other major systems.

=== Thai variants ===
H.6A
(Thai: ฮ.๖ก) Royal Thai Armed Forces designation for the UH-1N.

=== Italian-built variants ===
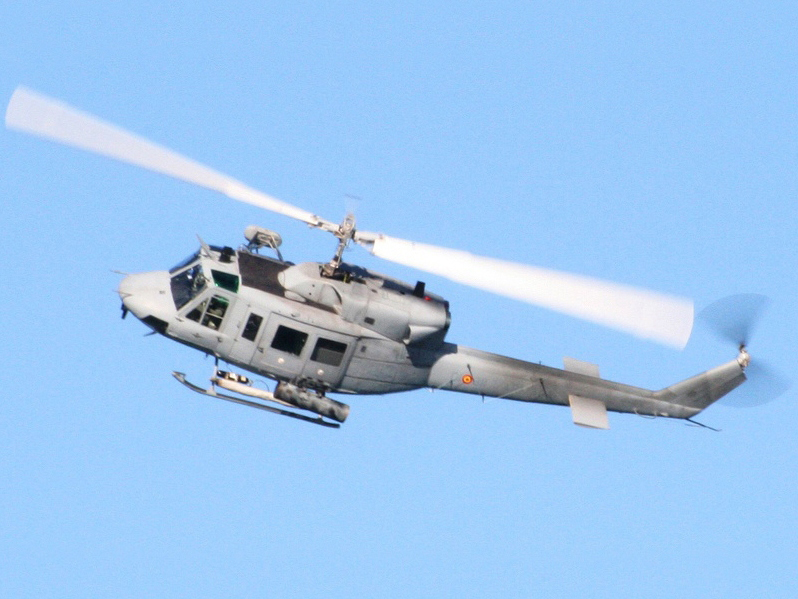
An Agusta Bell AB 212 ASW of the Spanish Navy

Agusta-Bell AB 212
Civil or military utility transport version. Built under license in Italy by Agusta.
Agusta-Bell AB 212EW
Electronic warfare version for Turkey.
Agusta-Bell AB 212ASW
Anti-submarine warfare, anti-shipping version of the AB 212 helicopter, built under license in Italy by Agusta. Operated by the Italian Navy, Hellenic Navy and Islamic Republic of Iran Navy, Peru, Spain, Turkey, and Venezuela.

The AB 212ASW is a Model 212 Twin Huey with a prominent radome above the cockpit. Early production had a dome-shaped radome, while later production had a flatter "drum" radome. A left side winch is used for dipping the Bendix ASQ-18 sonar. Other changes include structural reinforcement for a gross weight of 11,197 lbs (5,080 kg), ECM, shipboard deck tie-down attachments and corrosion protection. Armament is two Mk 44 or Mk 46 torpedoes or two depth charges in the ASW role and four AS.12 air-to-surface wire-guided missiles for the anti-shipping role.

== Operators ==
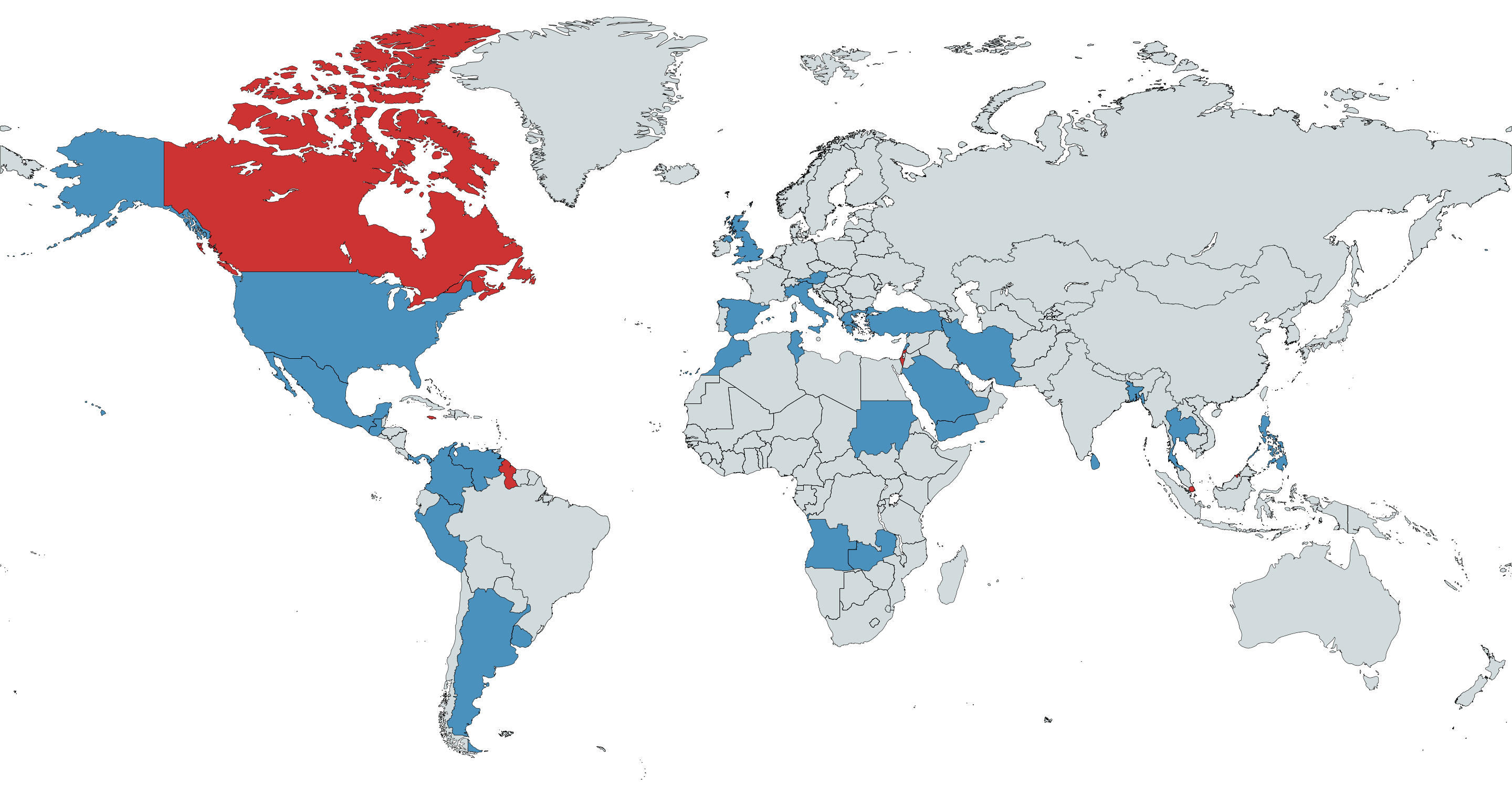
A map of UH-1N operators in blue and former operators in red

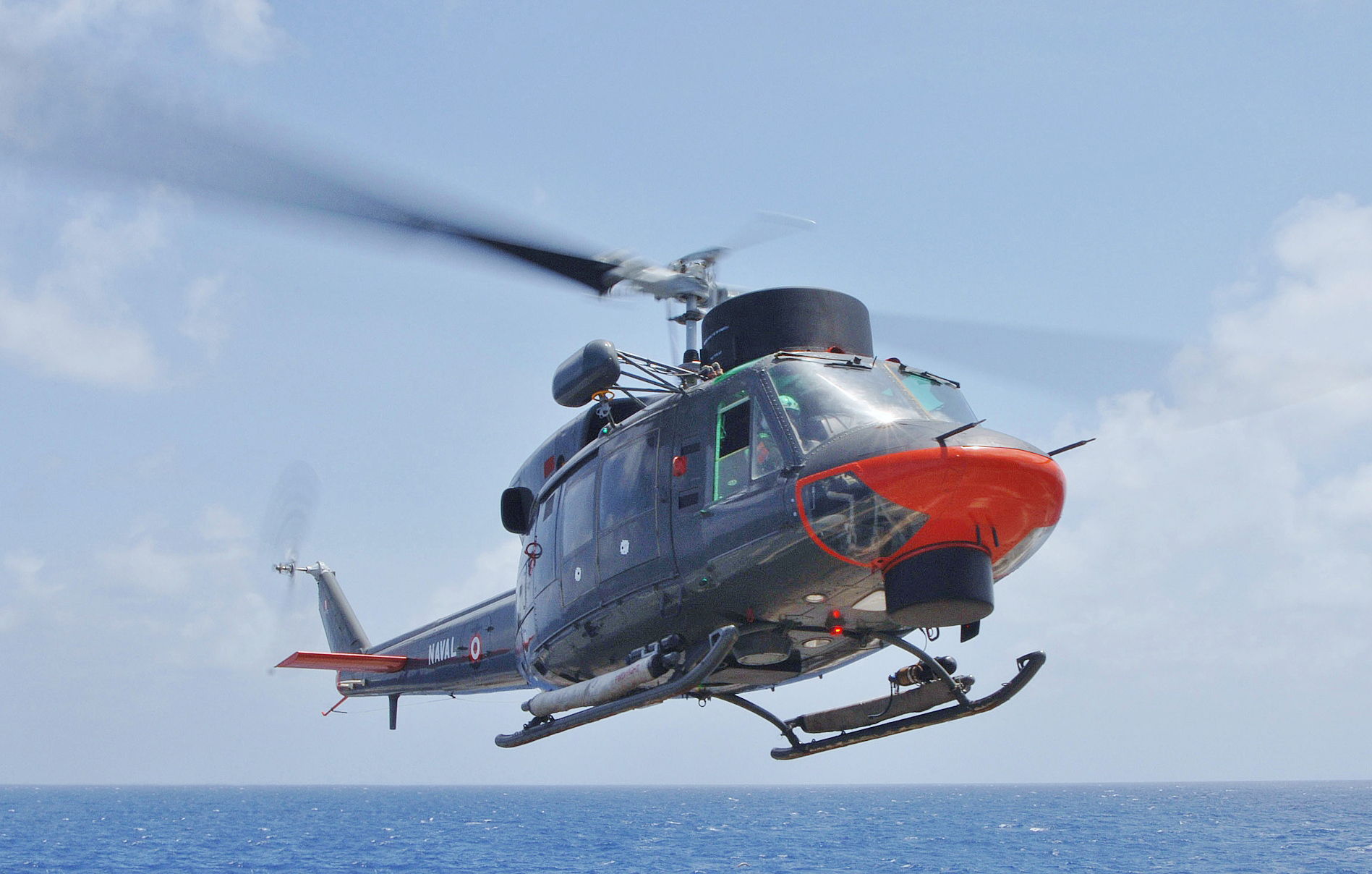
A Peruvian AB 212

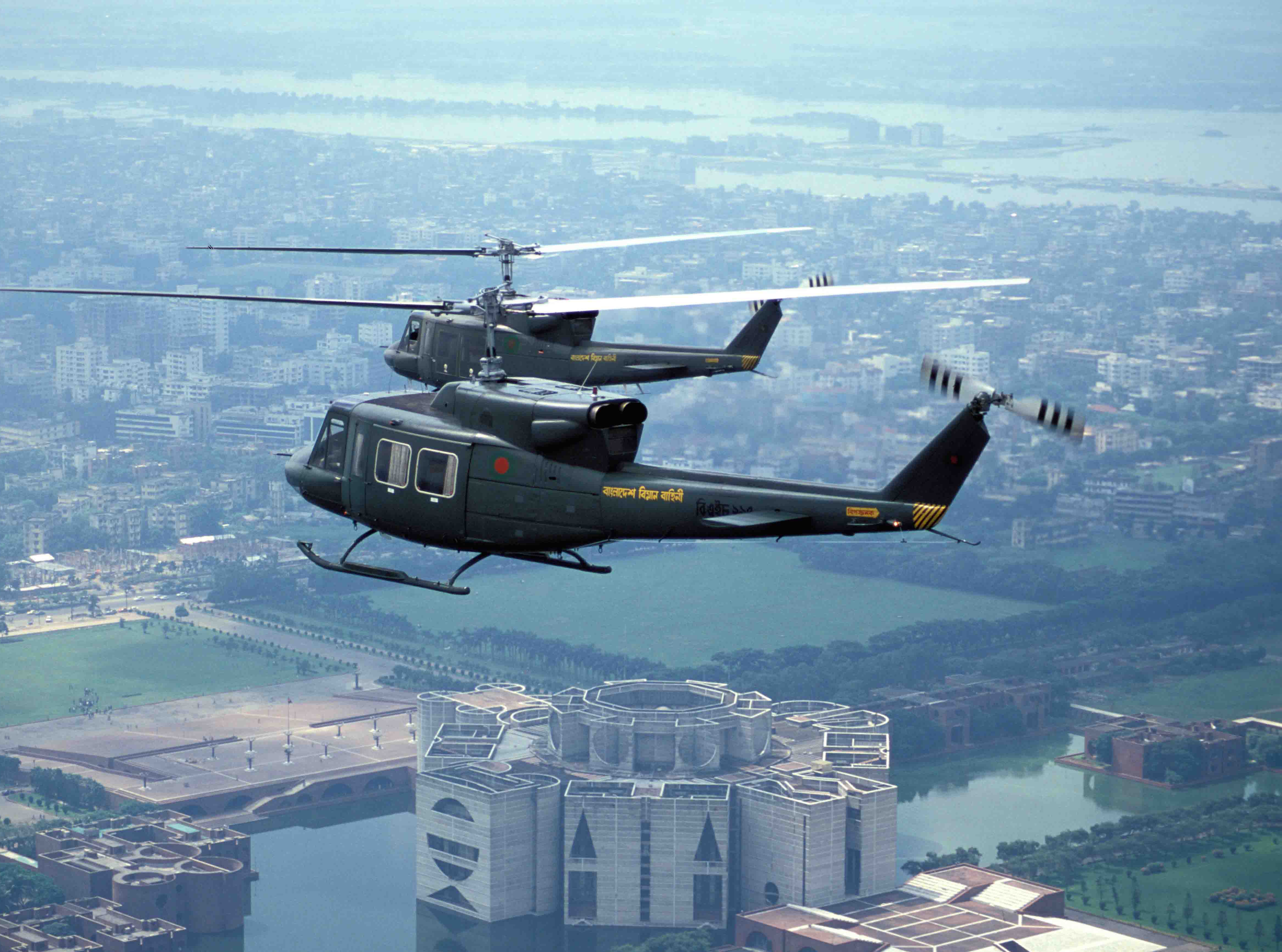
Bangladesh Air Force Bell-212s flying in formation over the National parliament of Bangladesh

Angola

- National Air Force of Angola

Argentina

- Argentine Air Force
  - 7th Air Brigade - 1st Search and Rescue Squadron

Austria

- Austrian Air Force

Bahrain

- Royal Bahraini Air Force

Bangladesh

- Bangladesh Air Force operates 14 Bell 212
  - 9th Squadron "Scorpions"

Colombia

- Colombian Aerospace Force
- Colombian Army
- Colombian Navy

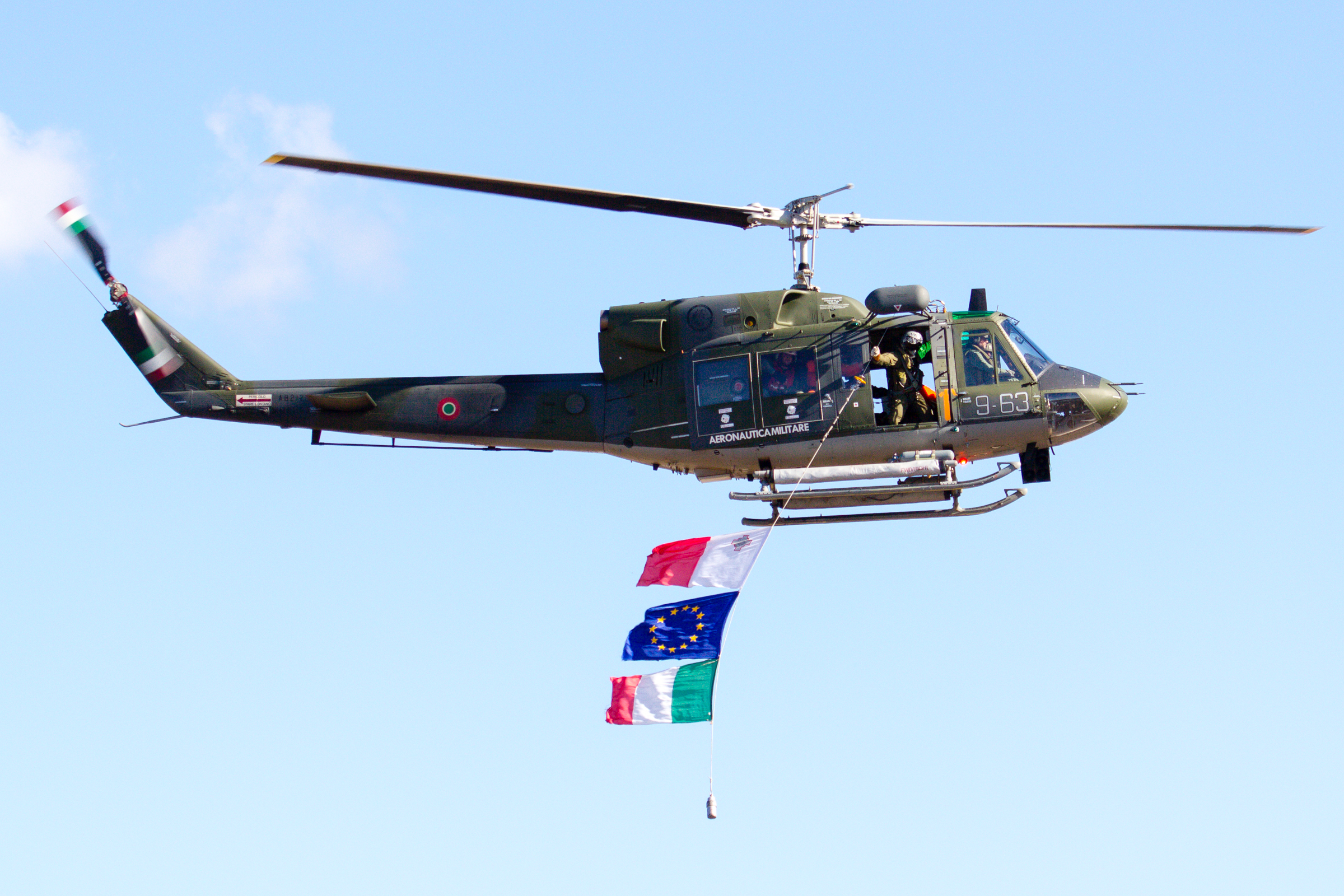
An Italian Air Force Agusta Bell AB 212 at the 2015 Malta International Airshow

Greece

- Hellenic Navy

Guatemala

- Guatemalan Air Force

Iran

- Islamic Republic of Iran Air Force
- Islamic Republic of Iran Navy

Italy

- Italian Air Force operates 36 aircraft
- Italian Navy

Lebanon

- Lebanese Air Force 7 aircraft

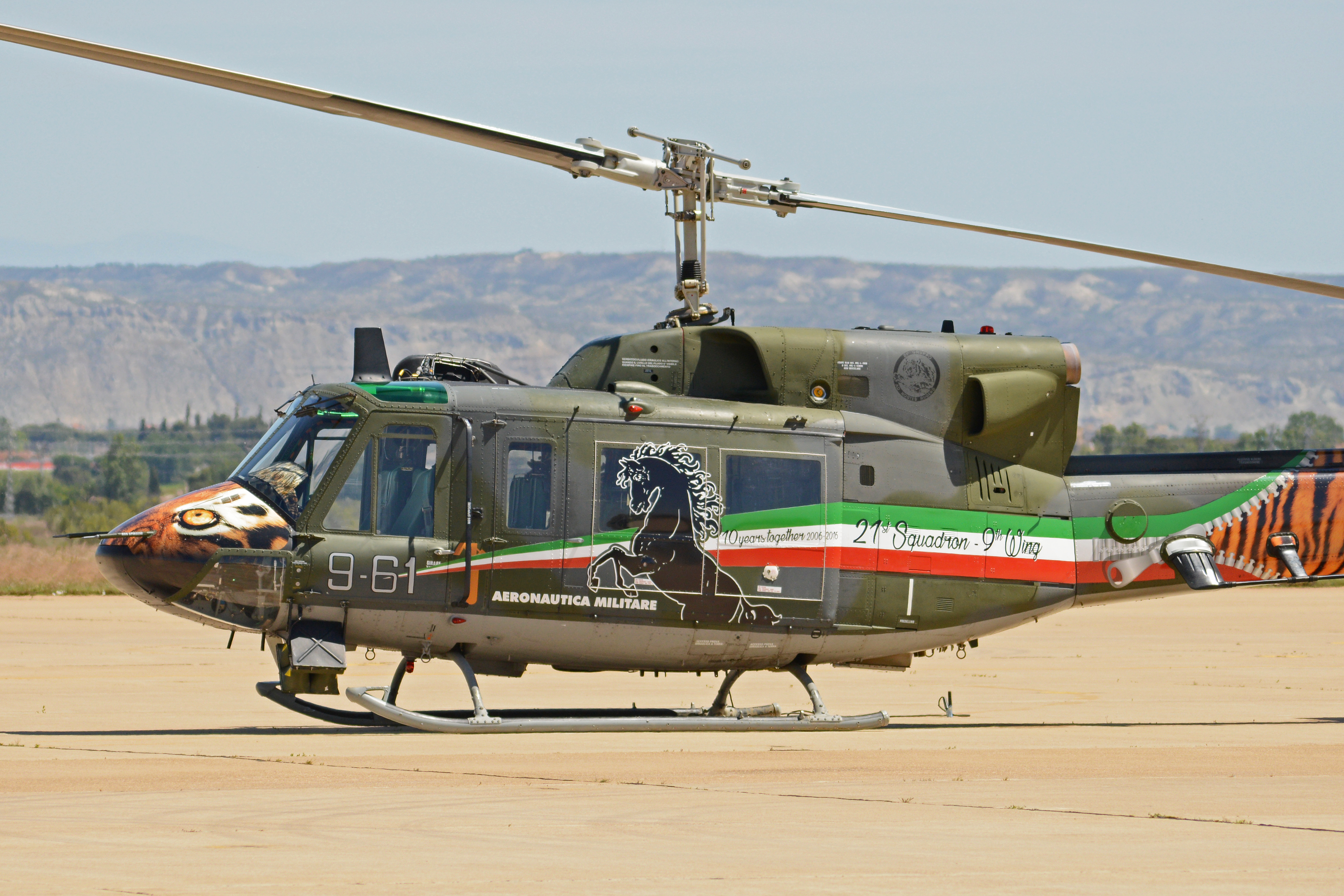
An Agusta-Bell HH-212A of Italy

Mexico

- Mexican Air Force

Morocco

- Royal Moroccan Air Force

Panama

- National Aeronaval Service

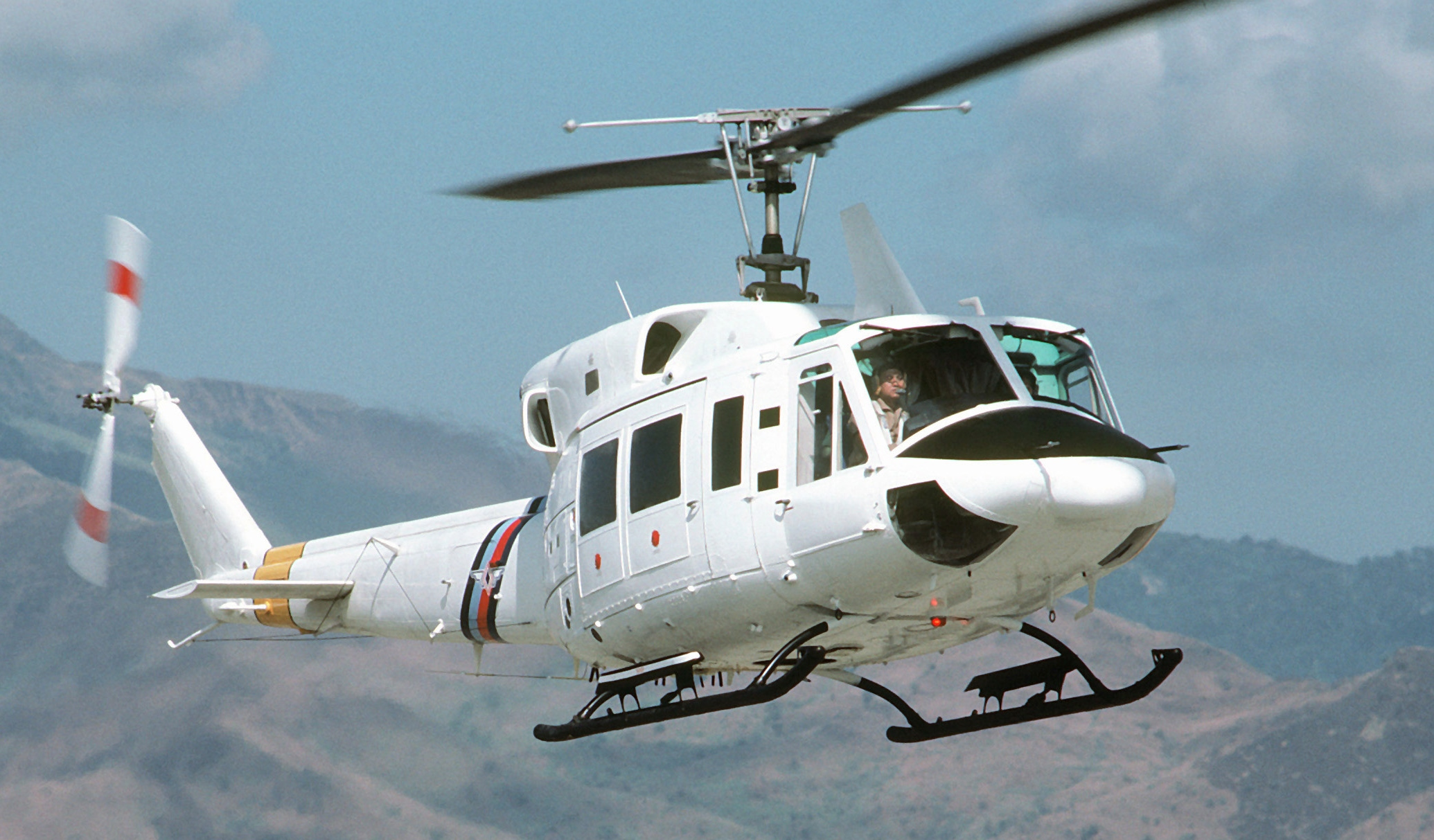
A UH-1N with Philippine Army officers aboard, prepares to land

Peru

- Peruvian Air Force
- Peruvian Navy

Saudi Arabia

- Royal Saudi Air Force

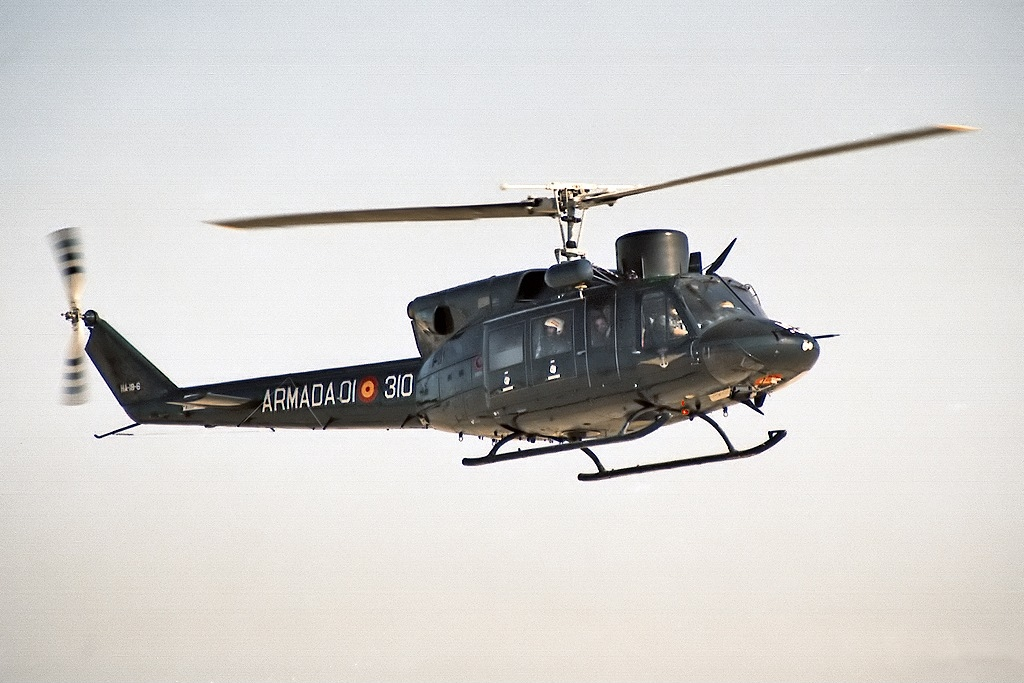
A Spanish Navy Bell 212

Spain

- Spanish Army
- Spanish Navy

Sri Lanka

- Sri Lanka Air Force

Sudan

- Sudan Air Force

Thailand

- Royal Thai Army
- Royal Thai Navy

Tunisia

- Tunisian Air Force

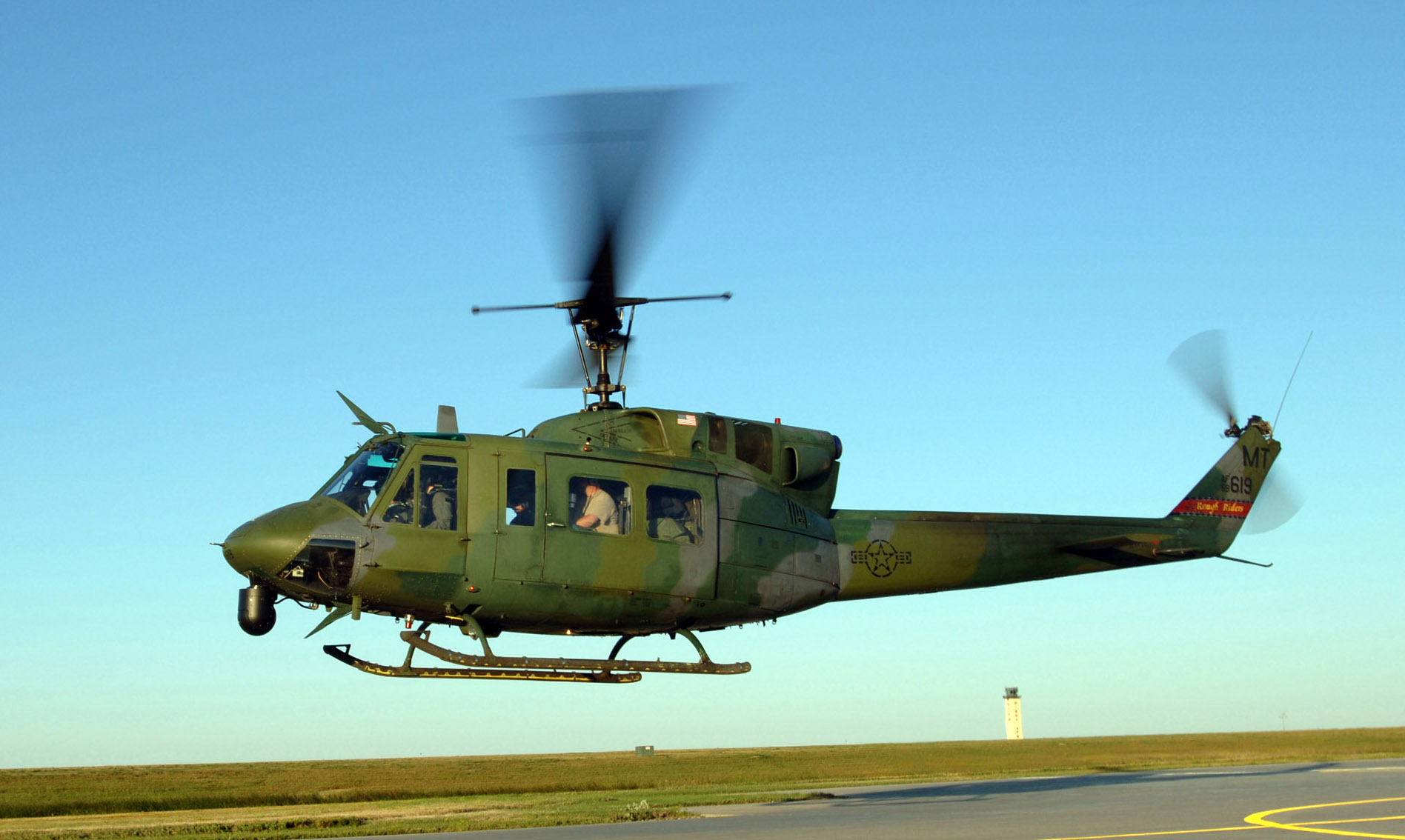
A USAF UH-1N takes off from Minot AFB in North Dakota

Turkey

- Turkish Navy

United States

- United States Air Force

Uruguay

- Uruguayan Air Force

Venezuela

- Venezuelan Navy

Yemen

- Yemeni Air Force

Zambia

- Zambian Air Force

=== Former operators ===
Albania

- Albanian Air Force

Brunei

- Royal Brunei Air Force

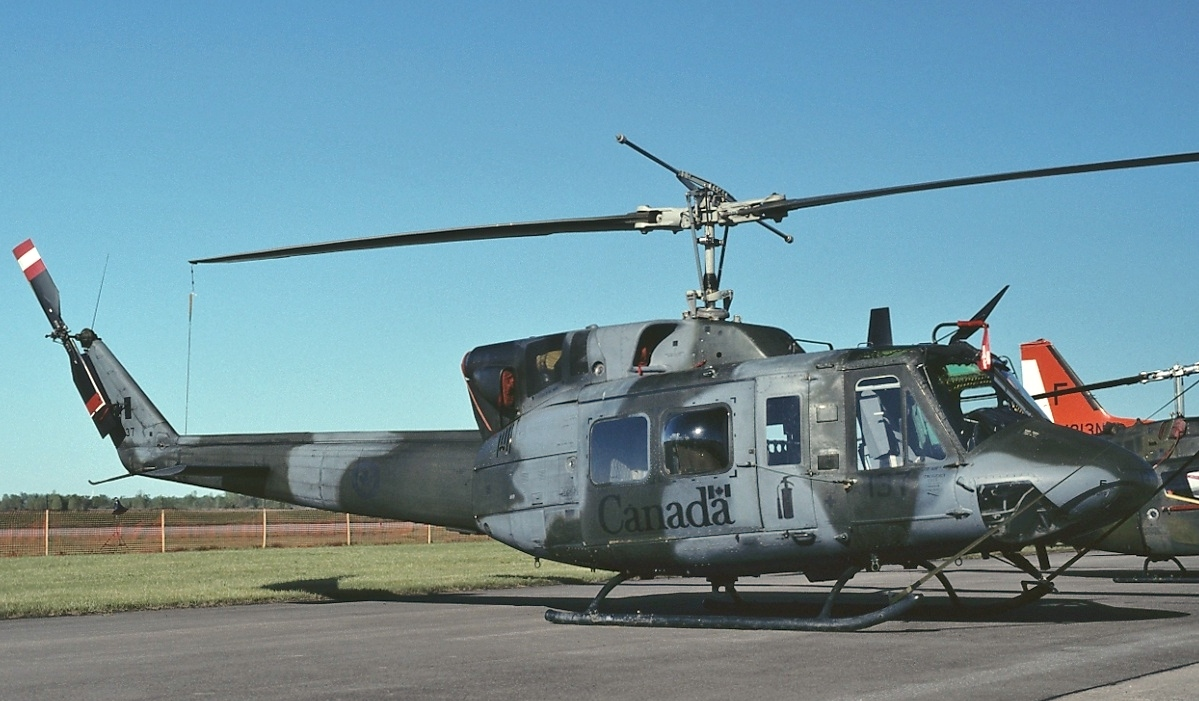
A CH-135 of the Canadian Forces

Canada

- Canadian Forces
  - 403 Helicopter Operational Training Squadron
  - 408 Tactical Helicopter Squadron
  - 422 Tactical Helicopter Squadron
  - 424 Transport & Rescue Squadron
  - 427 Tactical Helicopter Squadron
  - 430 Tactical Helicopter Squadron
  - 444 Combat Support Squadron
  - VU 32 - pre-Unification Royal Canadian Navy Utility Squadron
  - Aerospace Engineering Test Establishment
  - Base Flight Cold Lake
  - Base Rescue Goose Bay

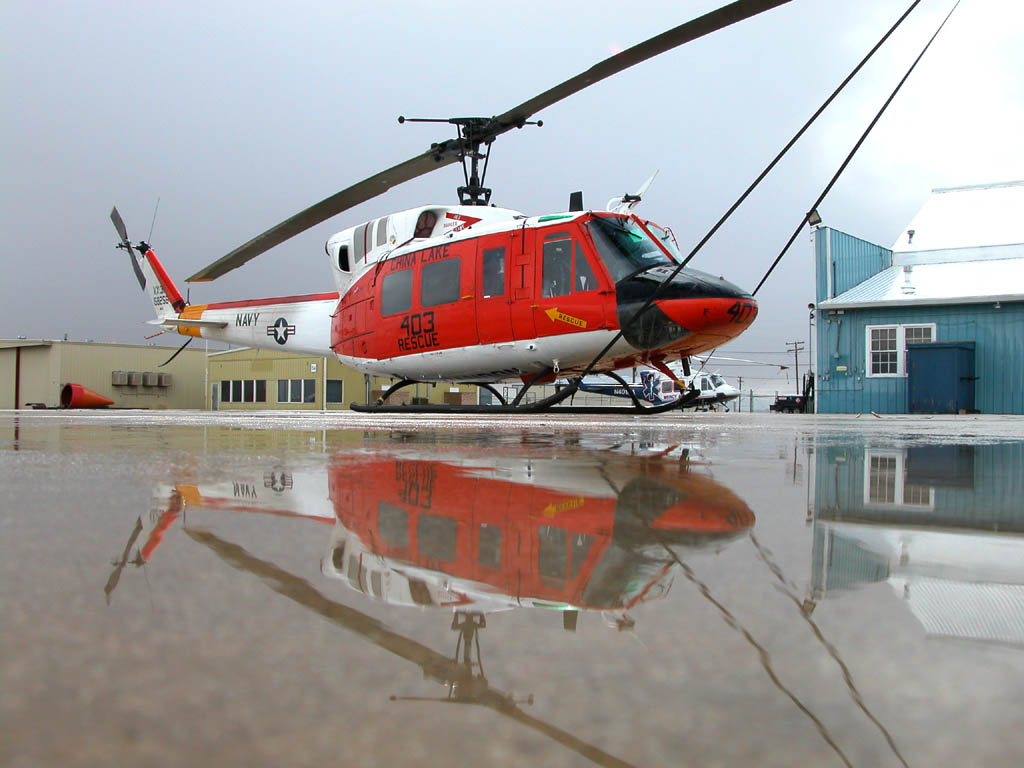
A United States Navy HH-1N from NAS China Lake at the Mojave Spaceport

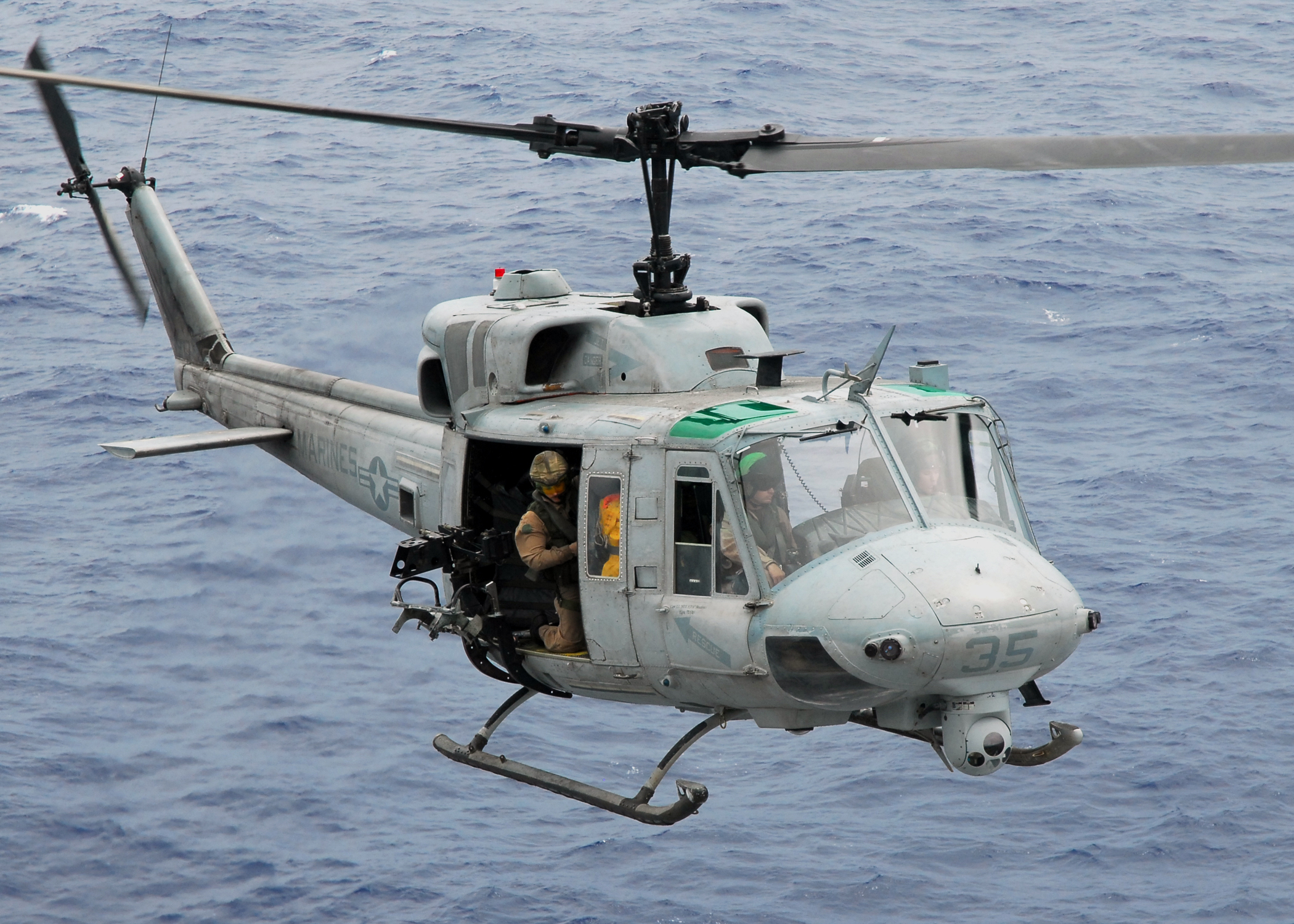
A USMC UH-1N Twin Huey, 2008

Guyana

- Guyana Defence Force

Israel

- Israeli Air Force

Jamaica

- Jamaica Defence Force

Philippines

- Philippine Air Force - 4 Units delivered to 250th Presidential Airlift Wing ,251 Special Airlift Squadron. Retired.

Singapore

- Republic of Singapore Air Force

United Kingdom

- Army Air Corps

United States

- United States Marine Corps
- United States Navy

== Aircraft on display ==
- Battleship Memorial Park, Mobile, Alabama, U.S.
- CH-135 135114 - Canada Aviation and Space Museum, Ottawa, Ontario, Canada
- CH-135 135102 - National Air Force Museum of Canada
- UH-1N 159198 – Flying Leatherneck Aviation Museum at MCAS Miramar, San Diego, California.

== Specifications (USMC UH-1N, as modified) ==
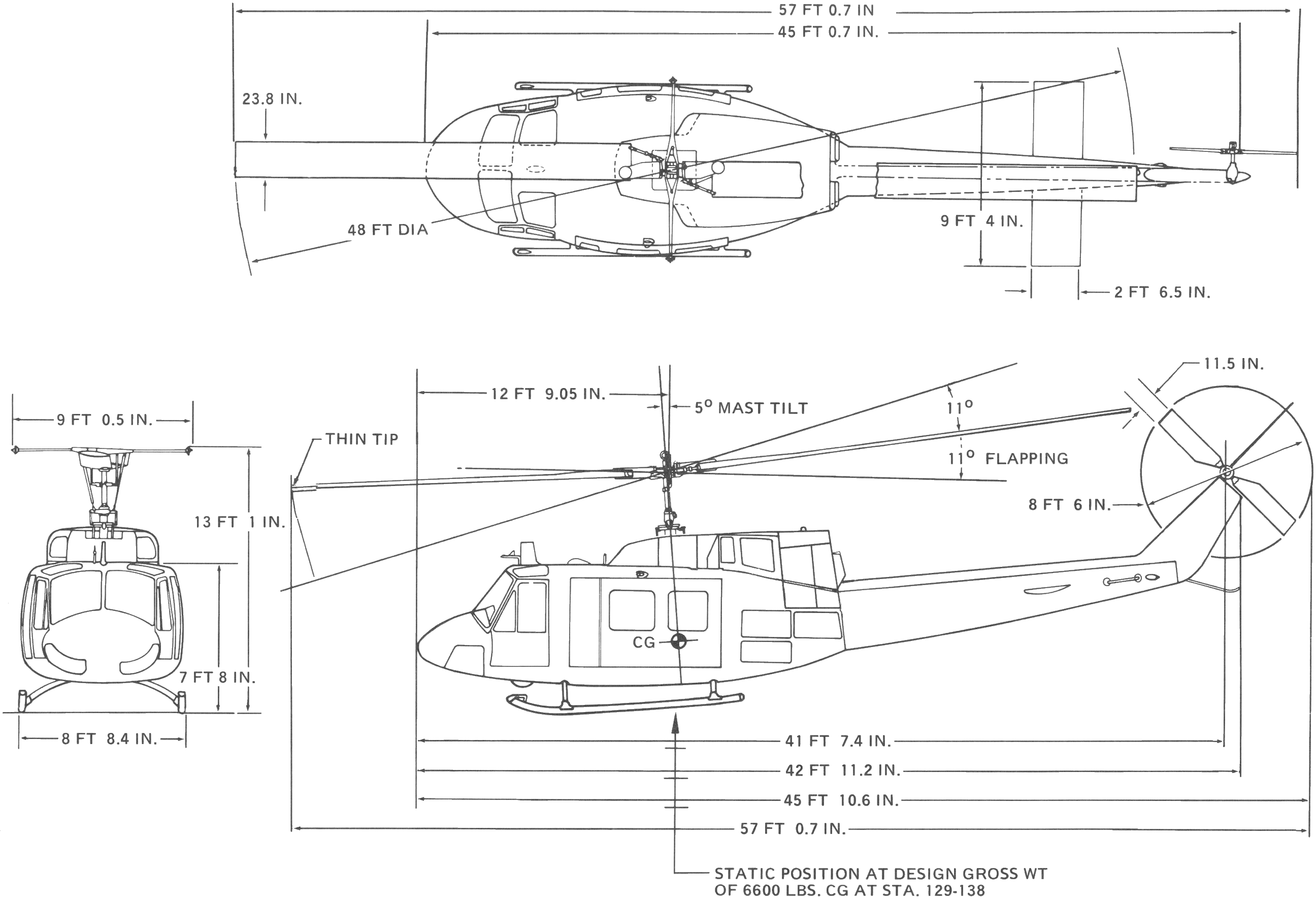
3-view drawing of the Bell UH-1N Iroquois

Data from USMC UH-1N Fact Sheet, The International Directory of Military Aircraft, 2002-2003

General characteristics

- Crew: 4 (pilot, co-pilot, crew chief, gunner)
- Capacity: 6–8 combat-equipped troops, or 4,400 lb (1,996 kg) equivalent cargo
- Length: 57 ft 8 in (17.58 m)
- Height: 14 ft 5 in (4.39 m)
- Max takeoff weight: 10,500 lb (4,763 kg)
- Powerplant: 1 × Pratt & Whitney Canada T400-CP-400 coupled turboshaft engine, 1,250 shp (930 kW)

900 shp (671 kW) emergency rating for each power section

- Main rotor diameter: 48 ft 0 in (14.63 m)
- Main rotor area: 1,808 sq ft (168.0 m^{2})
- Blade section: - root: NACA 0010.8; tip: NACA 0005.4 mod

Performance

- Maximum speed: 130 kn (150 mph, 240 km/h)
- Cruise speed: 110 kn (130 mph, 200 km/h)
- Range: 248 nmi (285 mi, 459 km)
- Service ceiling: 17,300 ft (5,300 m)
- Rate of climb: 1,755 ft/min (8.92 m/s)

Armament

- 2.75-inch (70 mm) rocket pods,
- 0.50 in (12.7 mm) GAU-16 machine gun,
- 7.62 mm (0.308 in) GAU-17 minigun or 7.62 mm (0.308 in) M240 lightweight machine gun

== Gallery ==
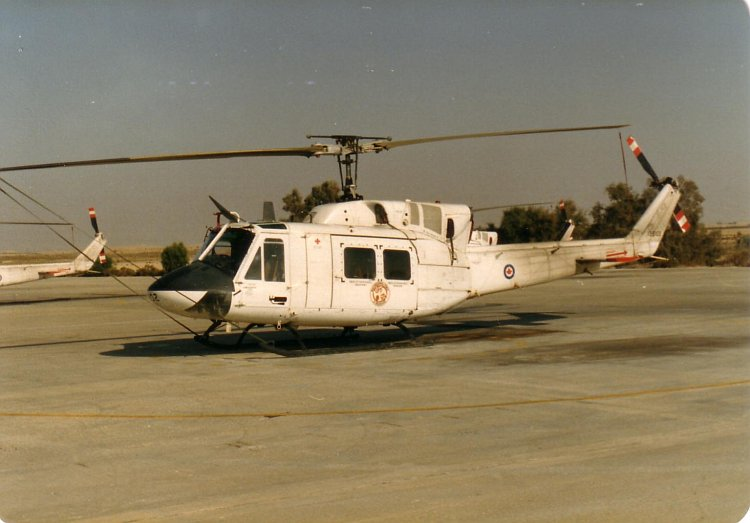
CH-135 Twin Huey 135102 serving with the Multinational Force and Observers Sinai, Egypt, 1989.

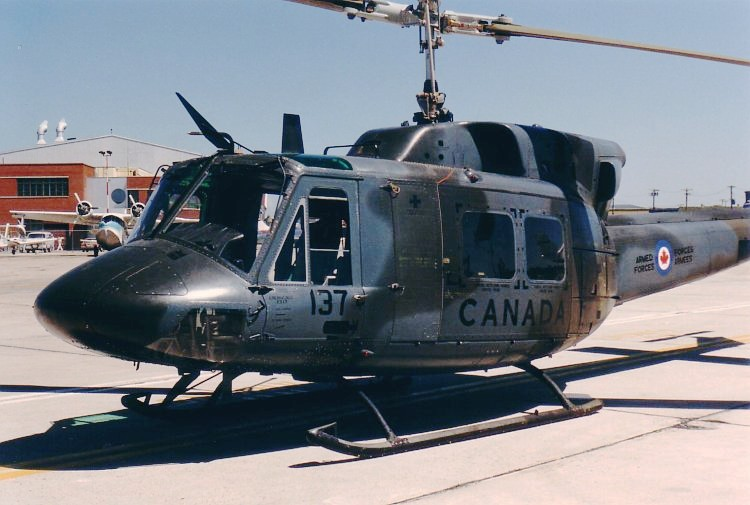
CH-135 Twin Huey 135137 in the original blue-gray and green camouflage pattern worn by these aircraft prior to 1986/88.

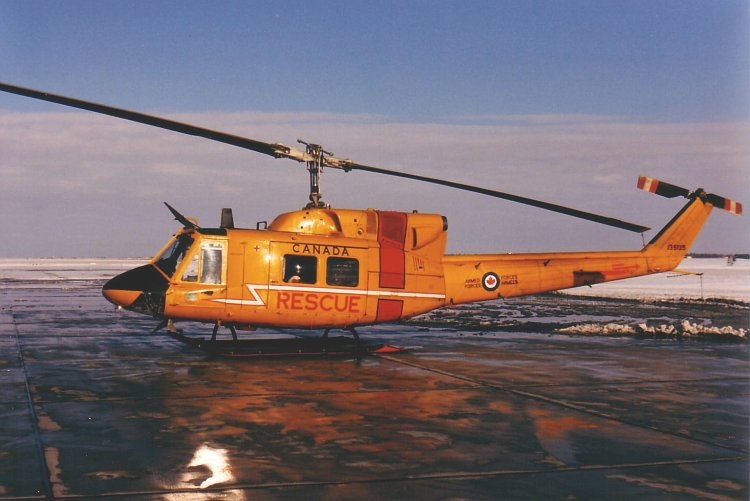
CH-135 Twin Huey 135135 in the early-style SAR markings, 1988. This aircraft was serving with Base Rescue Goose Bay and had formerly been assigned to 424 Transport & Rescue Squadron, CFB Trenton.

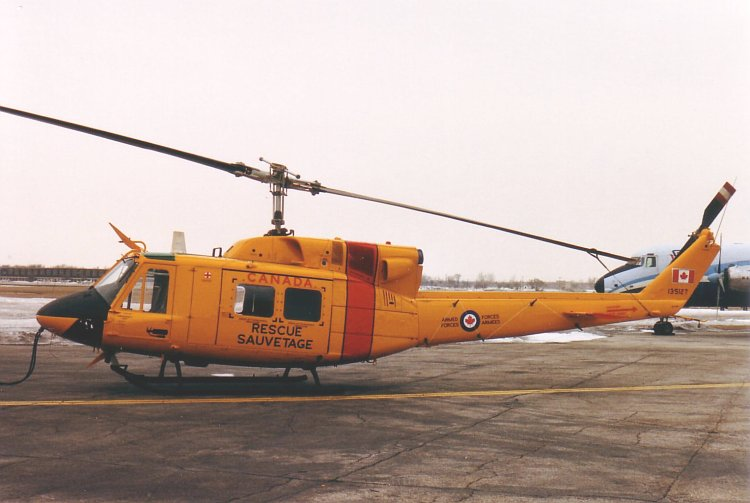
CH-135 Twin Huey 135127 from Base Rescue Goose Bay in the later SAR scheme used after 1986–88.

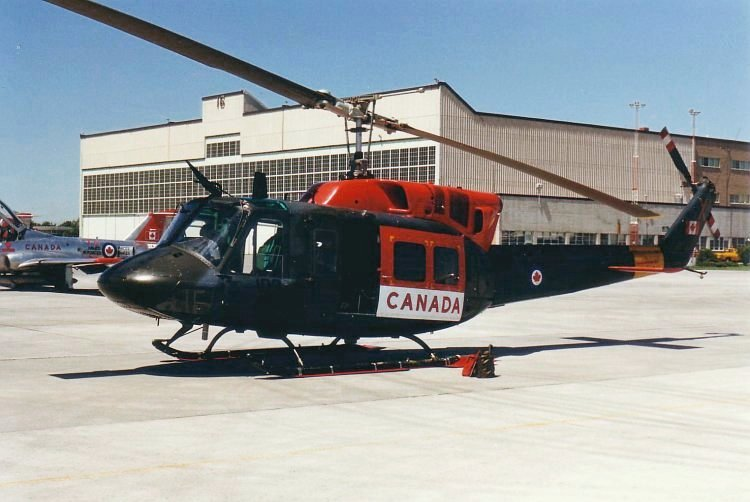
CH-135 Twin Huey 135103 in special flight test markings. The aircraft was used by the Aerospace Engineering Test Establishment at CFB Cold Lake, 1987.

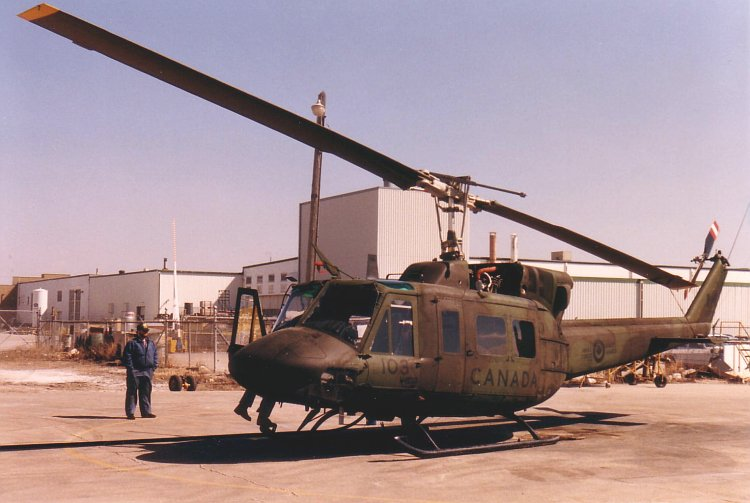
CH-135 Twin Huey 135103 after repainting in anti-IR olive and green scheme

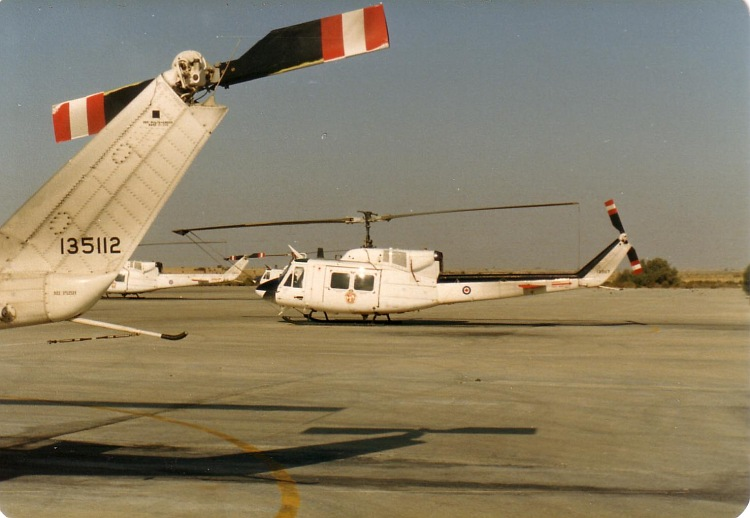
Canadian CH-135 Twin Hueys serving with the Multinational Force and Observers Sinai, Egypt 1989

CH-135 Twin Huey badge worn by some Canadian Forces air and ground crew, 1980s

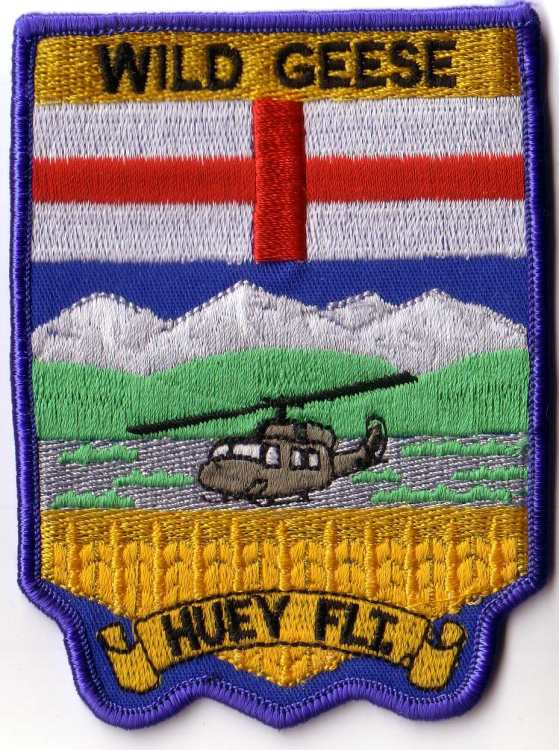
408 Tactical Helicopter Squadron UTTH Flight badge worn by CH-135 Twin Huey crews circa 1990. The badge is based on the shield of the province of Alberta.

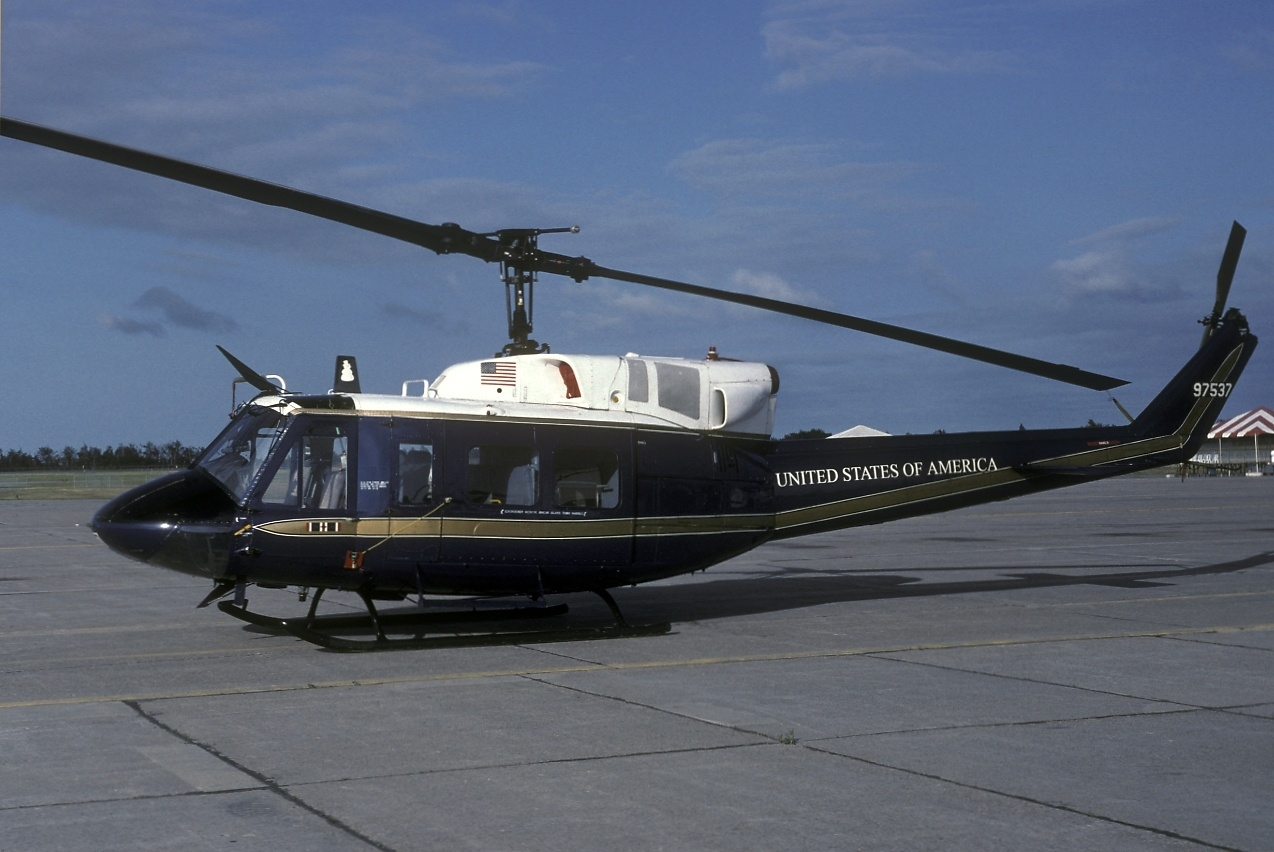
UH-1N serving with the 1st Helicopter Squadron at Joint Base Andrews.

== See also ==
- Huey Creek

Related development

- Bell 204/205
- Bell 212
- Bell UH-1 Iroquois
- Bell UH-1Y Venom
- Bell CH-146 Griffon

Related lists

- List of aircraft of the AOC
- List of active Canadian military aircraft
