= 336th Training Group =

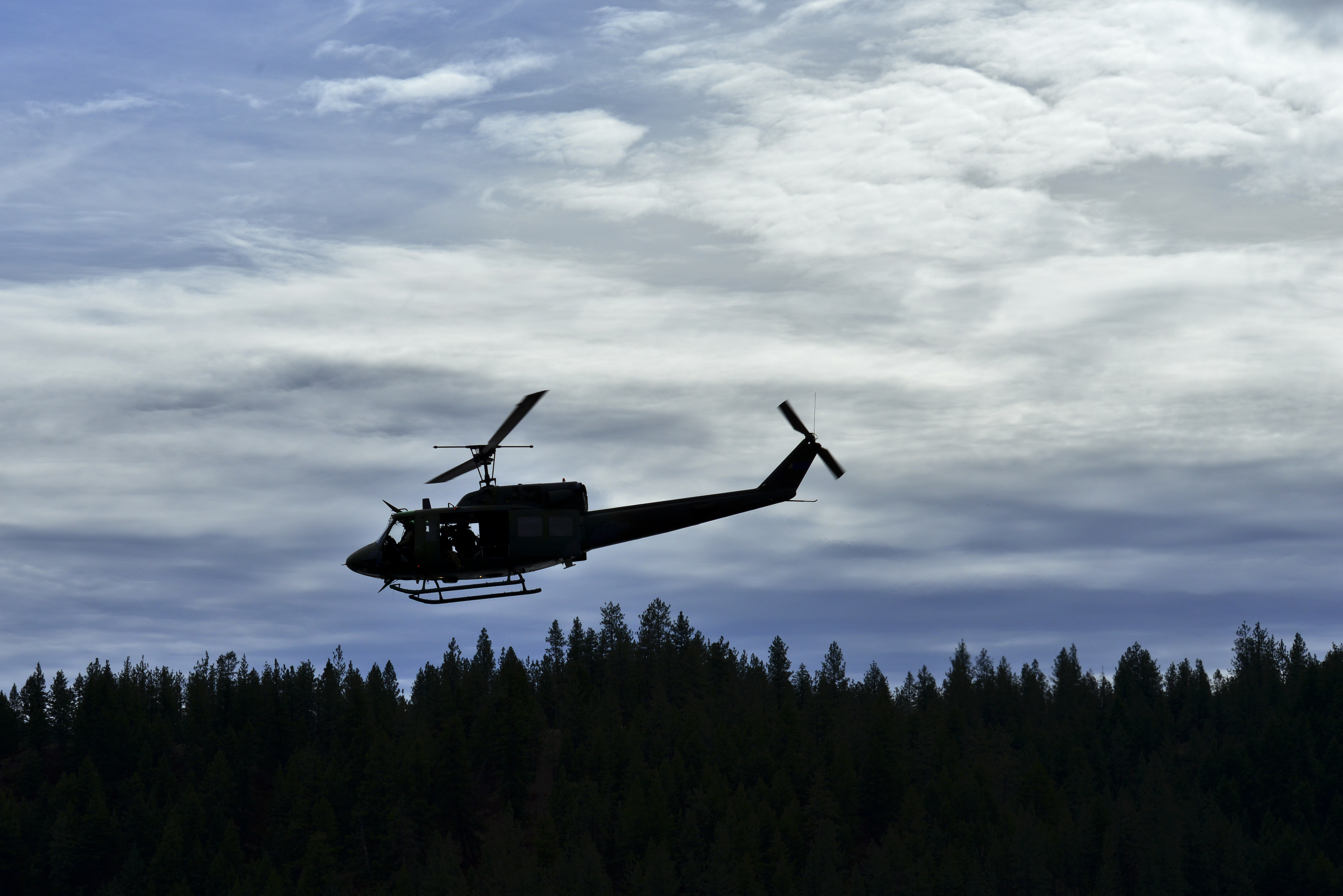
- 36th Rescue Flight helicopter on a freefall swimmer training mission
- Active: 1942–1944; 1966–present
- Country: United States
- Branch: United States Air Force
- Role: Survival training
- Part of: Air Education and Training Command
- Motto: Return With Honor
- Decorations: Air Force Outstanding Unit Award

Insignia
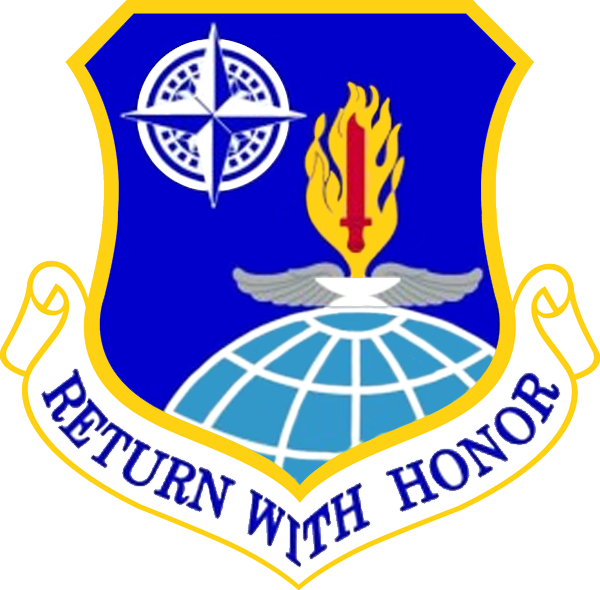
- 336th Training Group emblem (Note: Approved 15 April 1975.)

The 336th Training Group is the combat survival training group of the United States Air Force. The group is located at Fairchild Air Force Base, Washington, with one subordinate unit at Naval Air Station Pensacola, Florida, and one at Eielson Air Force Base, Alaska.

The Group operates the United States Air Force Survival School. The school provides instruction in Survival, Evasion, Resistance and Escape (SERE) training, primarily to aircrew. Instruction concentrates on the principles, techniques, and skills necessary to survive in any environment and to return safely.

The unit was first organized as the 336th Bombardment Group which was a World War II United States Army Air Forces training organization. It served in the United States from July 1942 to May 1944.

== History ==
=== World War II training unit ===
The unit was established in mid-1942 by III Bomber Command as a Replacement Training Unit (RTU) for Martin B-26 Marauder crews. Graduates from Training Command technical, gunnery and twin-engine flight schools would be trained on B-26s, then after graduation be assigned to combat units overseas. The group was inactivated in May 1944.

=== Survival Training ===
==== Background ====
In 1949, Strategic Air Command (SAC) was concerned about the ability of its aircrews to survive and evade capture if shot down behind enemy lines. It established the 3904th Training Squadron at Fort Carson, Colorado, on 16 December to provide survival and escape and evasion skills for its crews. Little more than a year later, on 21 October 1950, it established the 3904th Composite Wing to include the training squadron, the specialized 8th Air Rescue Squadron, and support units.

On 1 September 1951, the 3904th moved to Stead Air Force Base, Nevada, and the United States Air Force Survival School was established under the wing. The Korean War made it apparent that this training should not be limited to SAC, and on 1 September 1954, the 3904th was transferred to Air Training Command (ATC) and renamed the 3635th Combat Crew Training Wing (Survival). This wing changed its name to the 3635th Flying Training Wing (Advanced) on 15 July 1958 when it added helicopter training to its mission. The 3635th continued to provide Survival, Evasion, Resistance and Escape (SERE) training at Stead until the spring of 1966, when Stead closed and the survival school was moved to Fairchild Air Force Base, Washington.

==== Move to Fairchild Air Force Base ====
The 3635th Wing did not move with the school. Instead, ATC discontinued it at Stead on 15 June 1966 and established the 3636th Combat Crew Training Group at Fairchild in April 1966 to conduct survival training at its new location.

However, all aspects of Survival, Evasion, Resistance and Escape (SERE) training were not unified under the group. By the early 1970s, Pacific Air Forces was running the Jungle Survival School at Clark Air Base, Philippines, while United States Air Forces Southern Command had a Tropical Survival School at Howard Air Force Base in the Panama Canal Zone. Alaskan Air Command had an Arctic Survival School at Eielson Air Force Base, Alaska and Tactical Air Command operated a Water Survival School at Homestead Air Force Base, Florida. In April 1971, these schools were brought under one hand, and the 3636th Group was upgraded in status to the 3636th Combat Crew Training Wing. Squadrons were organized to conduct training at Clark, Fairchild and Homestead, while detachments were established at the other locations including with Operation Red Flag at Nellis Air Force Base where Detachment 2, 3636 Combat Crew Training Wing (Det 2), was established to conduct evaluations and provide training of personnel assigned or Temporary Duty. Det 2 conducted simulated Search and Rescue Exercises in Northern Nevada and at CFB Cold Lake, Edmonton, Alberta, Canada, with various air units, from 1976 to 1985. It was at Det 2 that the Combat Desert Survival Course was written and tested. This course would be formalized by the wing and eventually this would cause a major change in the USAF Survival Training Schools emphasizing "Combat Survival" instead of "Global Survival". In 1985, Det 2 was discontinued and its personnel were assigned to the Tactical Air Command at Nellis Air Force Base or transferred back to the 3636th.

Detachment 2, 66th Training Squadron, was located at NAS Pensacola, Florida in 1993 where it conducted the Parachute Water Survival Course for aircrew flying aircraft with ejection seats jointly with the United States Navy. The separate Air Force School at Homestead was discontinued. Students attending SERE training at Fairchild, were sent on temporary duty to Pensacola for this training. The school was moved to Fairchild in August 2015, and combined with the existing non-ejection water survival course to avoid the expenses associated with student travel.

=== Courses circa 2016 ===
- The 22d Training Squadron conducts Combat Survival Training.
- The 66th Training Squadron conducts the SERE Training Instructor Course.

This is a five-and-one-half-month program designed to teach future survival instructors how to instruct aircrew members to survive in any environment. The non-ejection water survival course trains aircrew members of non-parachute-equipped aircraft. The resistance training orientation course covers the theories and principles needed to conduct Level C Code of Conduct resistance training laboratory instruction. The SERE training instructor, 7-level upgrade course is a 19-day course, conducted annually, provides 5-level instructors with advanced survival training in barren Arctic, barren desert, jungle, and open-ocean environments.

== Lineage ==
336th Bombardment Group

- Established as the 336th Bombardment Group (Medium) on 9 July 1942

Activated on 15 July 1942
Disbanded on 1 May 1944

- Reestablished and redesignated 336th Air Refueling Wing, Heavy on 31 July 1985 (Remained inactive)
- Consolidated with the 3636th Combat Crew Training Group as the 3636th Combat Crew Training Group on 1 January 1993

336th Training Group

- Established as the 3636th Combat Crew Training Group (Survival) and organized on 1 March 1966

Redesignated: 3636th Combat Crew Training Wing (Survival) on 1 April 1971

- Consolidated with the 336th Air Refueling Wing on 1 January 1993

Redesignated: 336th Crew Training Group on 28 January 1993
Redesignated: 336th Training Group on 1 April 1994

== Assignments ==
- Third Air Force, 15 July 1942
- III Bomber Command, July 1942 – 1 May 1944
- Air Training Command, 1 March 1966
- Nineteenth Air Force, 1 July 1993
- Air Education & Training Command, July 2012
- Nineteenth Air Force, 1 October 2014 – Present

== Components ==
- 22d Training Squadron (see 3612th Combat Crew Training Squadron)
- 66th Training Squadron (see 3614th Combat Crew Training Squadron)
- 336th Training Support Squadron
- 478th Bombardment Squadron: 15 July 1942 – 1 May 1944
- 479th Bombardment Squadron: 15 July 1942 – 1 May 1944
- 480th Bombardment Squadron: 15 July 1942 – 1 May 1944
- 481st Bombardment Squadron: 15 July 1942 – 1 May 1944
- 3612th Combat Crew Training Squadron (later 22d Crew Training Squadron, 22d Training Squadron): 1 April 1971 – present
- 3613th Combat Crew Training Squadron (later 17th Crew Training Squadron, 17th Training Squadron): 1 April 1971 – 2 January 1997

Homestead Air Force Base, Florida (later Tyndall Air Force Base, Floris

- 3614th Combat Crew Training Squadron (later 66th Crew Training Squadron, 66th Training Squadron): 1 April 1971 – present

Clark Air Base, Philippines until April 1981

- 36th Rescue Flight, 1 July 1993 – 14 August 2015

== Stations ==
- MacDill Field, Florida, 15 July 1942
- Fort Myers Army Air Field, Florida, 10 August 1942
- Avon Park Army Air Field, Florida, 13 December 1942
- MacDill Field, Florida, 13 October 1943
- Lake Charles Army Air Field, Louisiana, 6 November 1943 – 1 May 1944
- Fairchild Air Force Base, Washington, 1 March 1966 – present

== Aircraft ==
- Martin B-26 Marauder, 1942–1944
- Bell UH-1 Iroquois, 1993–present
