= John S. Tuohy =

United States Air Force general

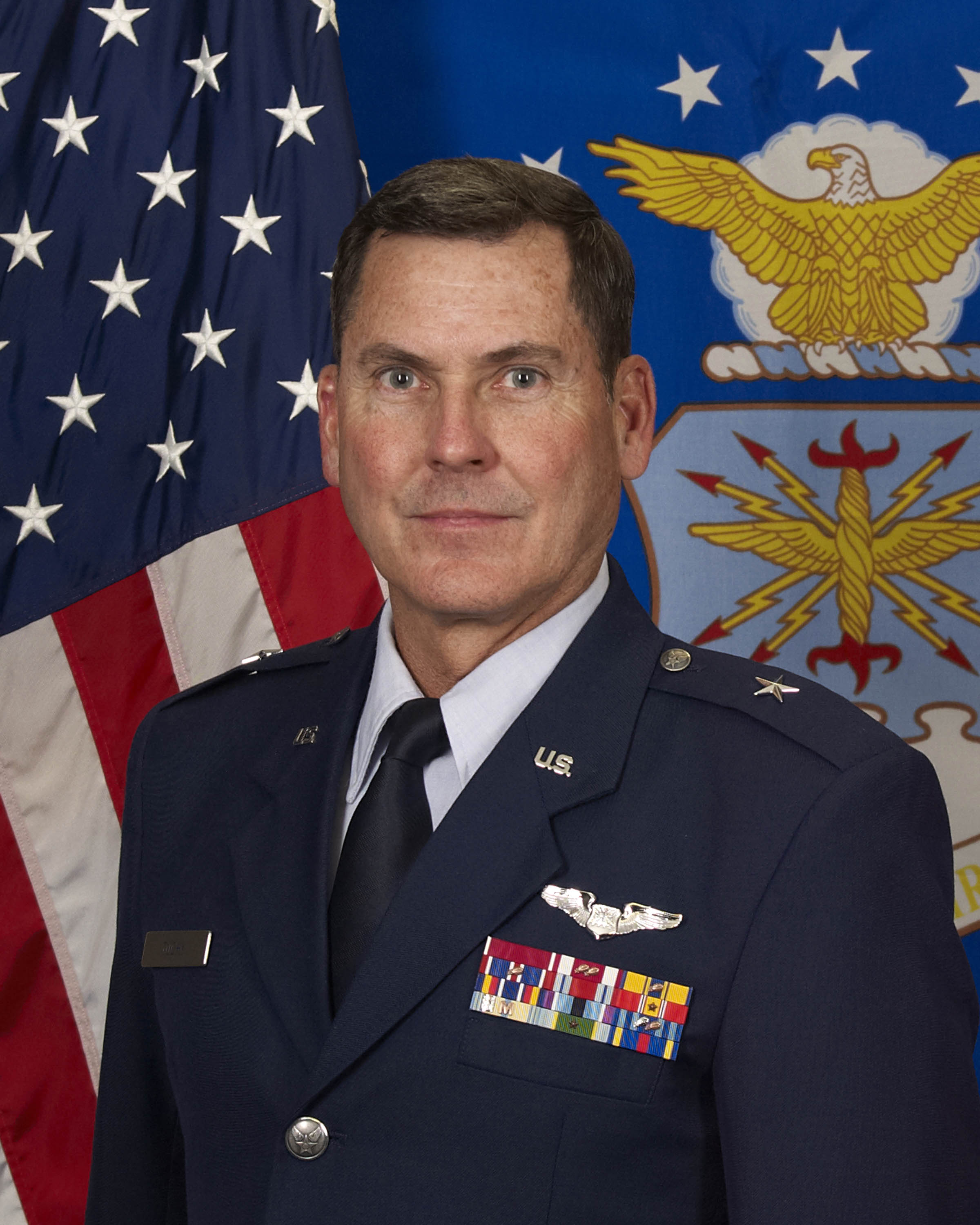
- Military career
- Allegiance: United States of America
- Branch: United States Air Force
- Service years: 1978–2017
- Rank: Brigadier general
- Commands: Washington Air National Guard 194th Regional Support Wing Chief of Staff, Joint Force Headquarters, Washington National Guard Detachment 1, Headquarters Washington Air National Guard 111th Air Support Operations Center Squadron
- Awards: Air Force Distinguished Service Medal; Legion of Merit; Defense Meritorious Service Medal et al. (See below)

John S. Tuohy is a retired brigadier general in the United States Air Force, last serving as the Assistant Adjutant General and Commander of the Washington Air National Guard (WA ANG), in which capacity he commanded 34 units and the 2,100 personnel attached to those units, while managing a budget of $50,000,000. General Tuohy was responsible to the Adjutant General of Washington, Major General Bret D. Daugherty, "to prepare, implement and administer plans, policies and programs to effectively organize, staff, equip and train units for state and federal mobilization." Additionally, General Tuohy oversaw the Washington Youth Academy, a division of the National Guard Youth Challenge Program in Bremerton, Washington, which provides quasi-military training and mentoring programs for 300 at-risk youths each year. Prior to his last assignment, then-Colonel Tuohy served as the Washington National Guard's Director of United States Property and Fiscal Office, in which capacity he was primarily responsible for receiving and accounting for all funds and property - in excess of $1,300,000,000 - of the United States in the possession of the Washington National Guard and ensuring that Federal funds were "obligated and expended in conformance with applicable statutes and regulations."

== Early life and education ==
The son of a United States Navy aviation machinist's mate, first class (AMM1) - whose service during World War II ended with an honorable discharge for medical reasons after his PB2Y Coronado crashed - Tuohy was born on 23 November 1956 in St. Petersburg, Florida. In 1974, he graduated from St. Petersburg High School. In 1978, he graduated from Florida State University (FSU) with a Bachelor of Science degree in management. Upon graduation, he was commissioned in the United States Air Force through the FSU Det 145 Reserve Officer Training Corps with honors as a Distinguished Graduate (top 10% of his class). He was also selected as the Det 145 Cadet Wing Commander. Additionally, he is a graduate of Squadron Officer School, Air Command and Staff College, Air Ground Operations School (twice Distinguished Graduate), and Air War College.

== General officer ==
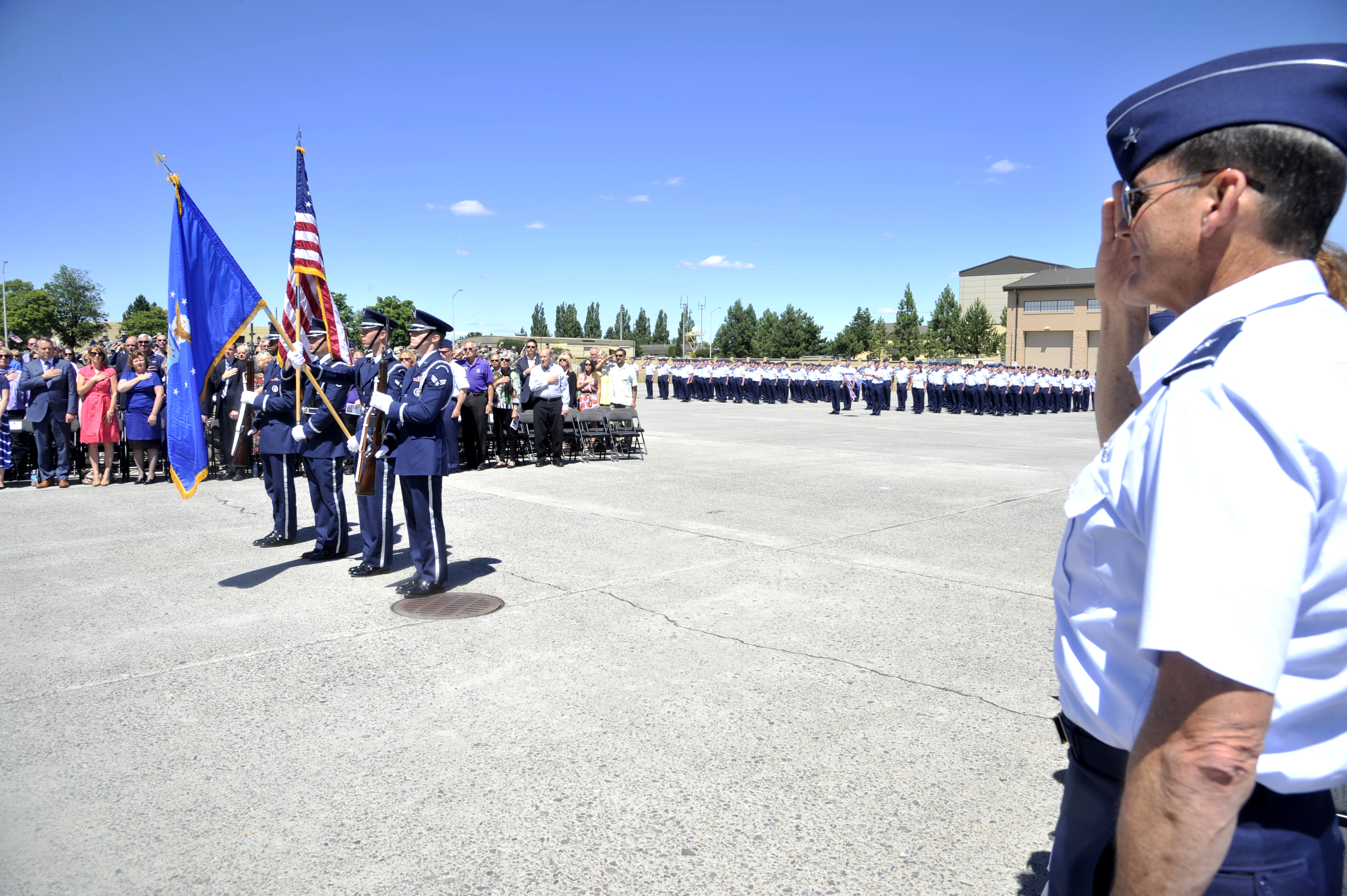
Brig Gen Tuohy rendering a salute as Team Fairchild honor guard members present the colors during the 92nd Air Refueling Wing change of command ceremony at Fairchild Air Force Base, Washington, 25 July 2014.

Promoted to brigadier general on 3 May 2014, Tuohy continued to serve in his role as assistant adjutant general for the Washington Air National Guard (WA ANG), which began in November 2013, while also assuming command of the WA ANG. During his tenure as Commander and Assistant Adjutant General - Air, Tuohy commanded the 141st Air Refueling Wing, the 194th Regional Support Wing, and the Western Air Defense Sector, which spanned 12 operational missions and five major commands, while simultaneously spearheading a cyber schoolhouse initiative. Tuohy's reputation as a responsible leader and masterful communicator led to a by-name request to serve on the Fiscal Stewardship Working Group tasked by the Chief of the National Guard Bureau General Frank J. Grass to write the fiscal stewardship comprehension plan for the National Guard of the United States. He also led the Washington Air National Guard in response to the unprecedented 2014 Oso Mudslide, the worst wildfires in the state's history, and the national level 2016 Cascadia Rising Exercise - the largest earthquake exercise in Washington state history simulating a 9.0 Cascadia Subduction Zone earthquake and tsunami along the Washington and Oregon coast. Additionally, he balanced the largest contingency deployments of Washington Airmen to date and the first Air National Guard activation and employment of a cyber protection team, while developing a benchmark mentorship program in the form of his popular off-hour "Fireside Chats," which often incorporated inspirational leaders including United States Air Force Ace Brigadier General Richard Stephen Ritchie.

== Retirement ==
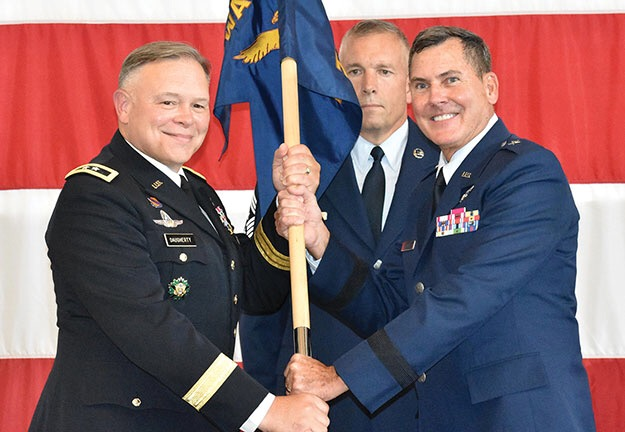
Outgoing commander of the Washington Air National Guard, Brig Gen John S. Tuohy, handing the unit guidon to MG Bret D. Daugherty under the watchful eyes of Washington Air National Guard Command Chief Master Sergeant Max Tidwell on 13 August 2017.

On 13 August 2017, after exactly 39 years of service, Brigadier General Tuohy celebrated the change of command of the Washington Air National Guard and his retirement in a ceremony at the Pierce County Readiness Center on Camp Murray. During this ceremony, he was awarded the Air Force Distinguished Service Medal and the Washington National Guard Distinguished Service Medal by Brigadier General (Ret.) Craig W. Blankenstein, the former Vice Commander of the Washington Air National Guard and close friend. "At the end of the day, here's what I want to leave you with, and here's what's important -- General Tuohy always got it right from matter of priorities. He was true to his values, and I have never worked with a man with higher integrity. It's quite simple...the whole time I worked with General Tuohy, it was always about the people," said Blankenstein. Additionally, Tuohy was presented with a U.S flag, which was flown over the United States Capitol on 28 June 2017 at the request of The Honorable Maria Cantwell, United States Senator, in honor of his retirement. The flag was also flown at the 141st Air Refueling Wing, the 194th Regional Support Wing, and the 225th Air Defense Group, representing the three major organizations of the Washington Air National Guard. The Washington State Secretary of State, Kim Wyman also presented Tuohy with a Washington state flag, which was flown over the Washington State Capitol in his honor. During the change of command ceremony, the Adjutant General of Washington state, Major General Bret D. Daugherty said, "[Brigadier General Tuohy] has served with great success, clearly, at all levels of command, as well as serving as our Human Resources Officer, our Chief of Staff of the Joint Force Headquarters, our State Partnerships Director in the early years when we got things going with Thailand, and our United States Property and Fiscal Officer. His hallmark successes include being the very first commander of the 194th Wing, along with pioneering an initiative for a joint cyber training schoolhouse to safeguard our critical infrastructure here in the state...Winston Churchill once said, 'We make a living by what we get, but we make a life by what we give' and John Tuohy, I believe, is the embodiment of that sentiment."

== Military career ==
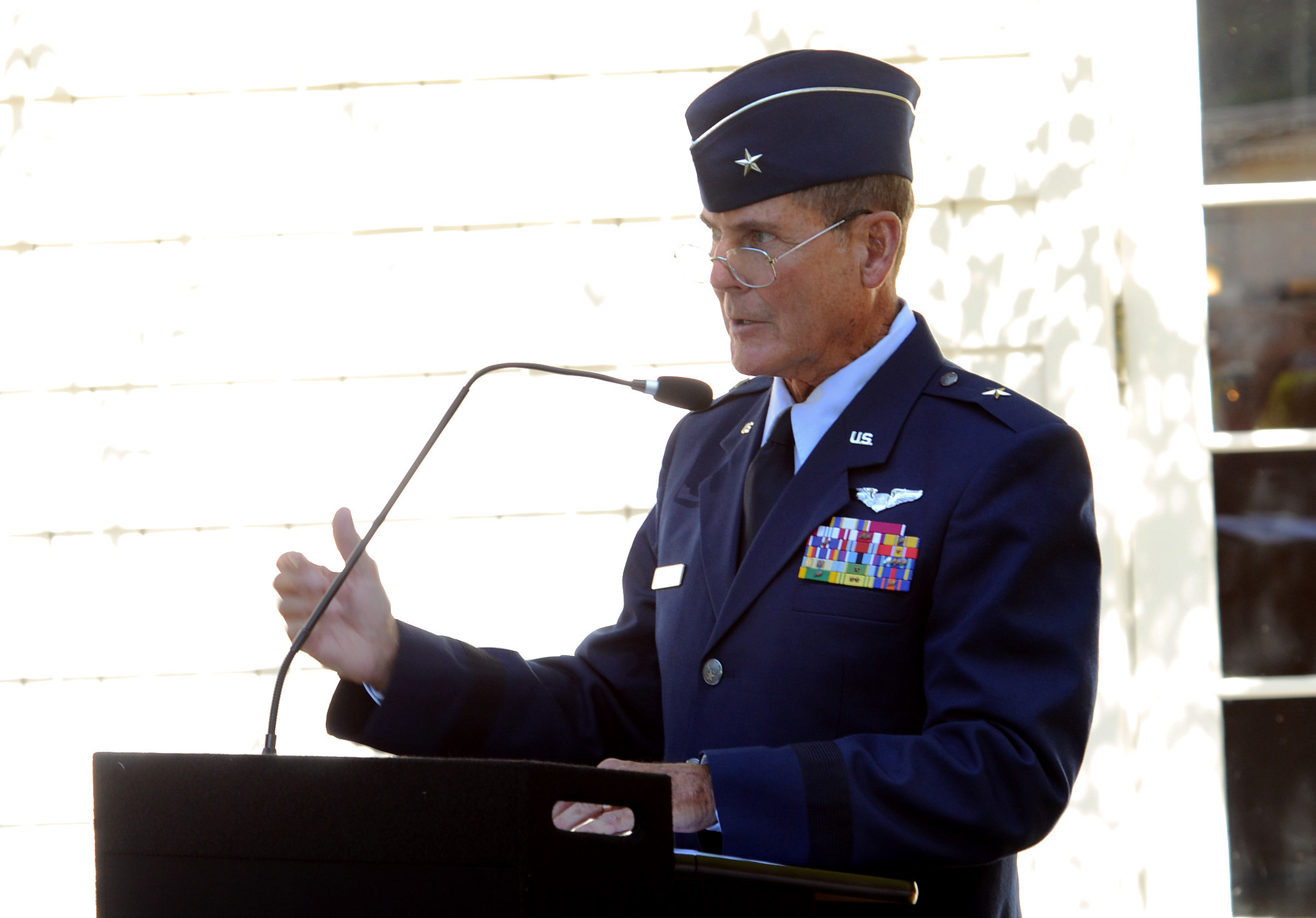
Washington Air National Guard Brig Gen (ret.) John S. Tuohy delivers formal remarks as the host for Brig Gen Jill Lannan's retirement ceremony held at Camp Murray, Washington, 09 Aug 2020.

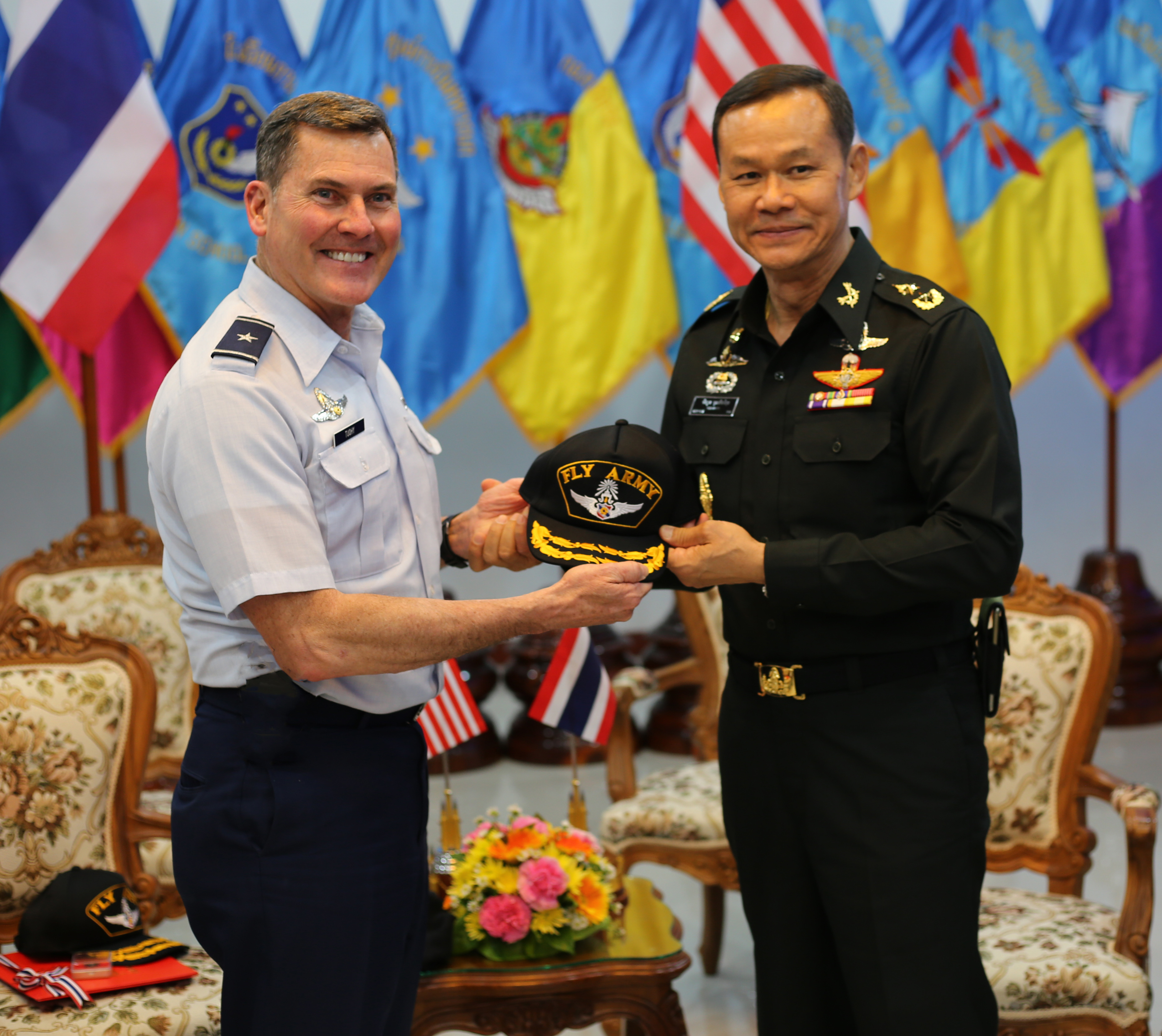
Brig Gen John Tuohy accepts a gift from Major General Chaivuth Yuthasilkul, Commanding General, AAVNC during a ceremony on 25 March 2016 at the Aviation Center in Lop Buri Province, Kingdom of Thailand.

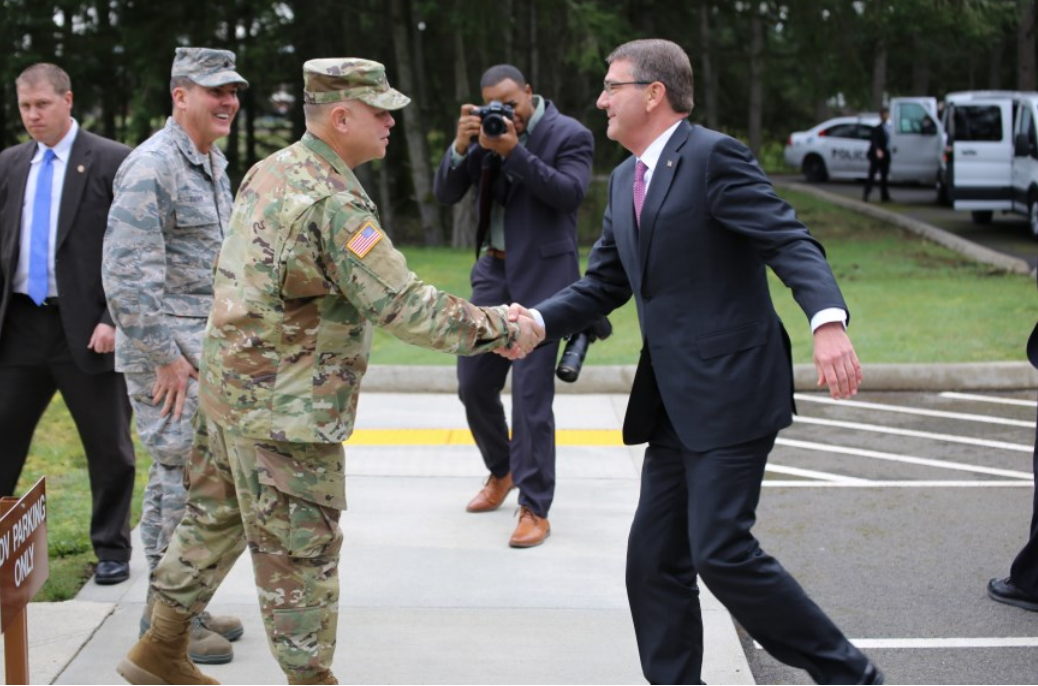
Major General Daugherty and Brigadier General Tuohy greeting Secretary of Defense Ashton Carter as he visits the 252nd Cyber Operations Group at Joint Base Lewis-McChord, 05 March 2016.

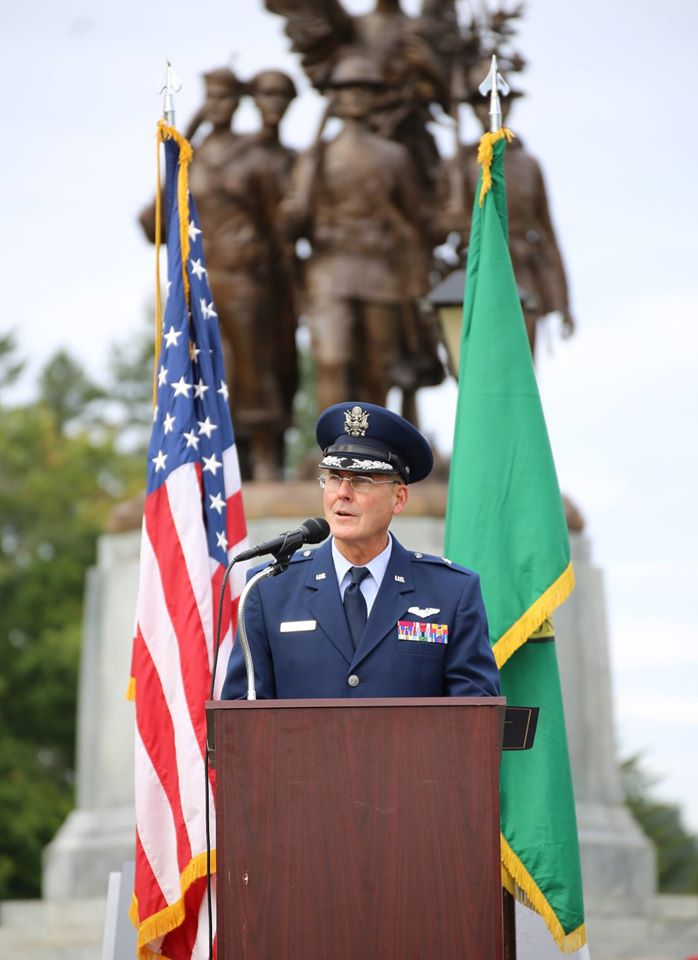
Brigadier General John Tuohy, Commander, Washington Air National Guard, reading the Governor's proclamation on the Washington State Capitol lawn during a ceremony to commemorate National POW/MIA Recognition Day, Olympia, Washington, 18 September 2015.

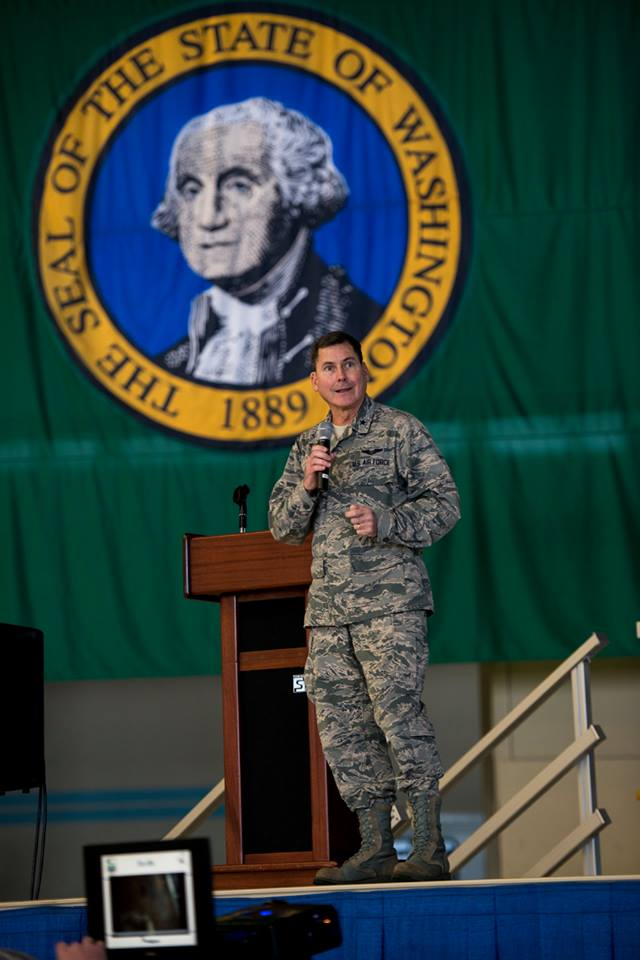
Brigadier General John S. Tuohy addressing the 141st Air Refueling Wing (141 ARW) at Fairchild Air Force Base, Spokane, Washington, 12 January 2015.

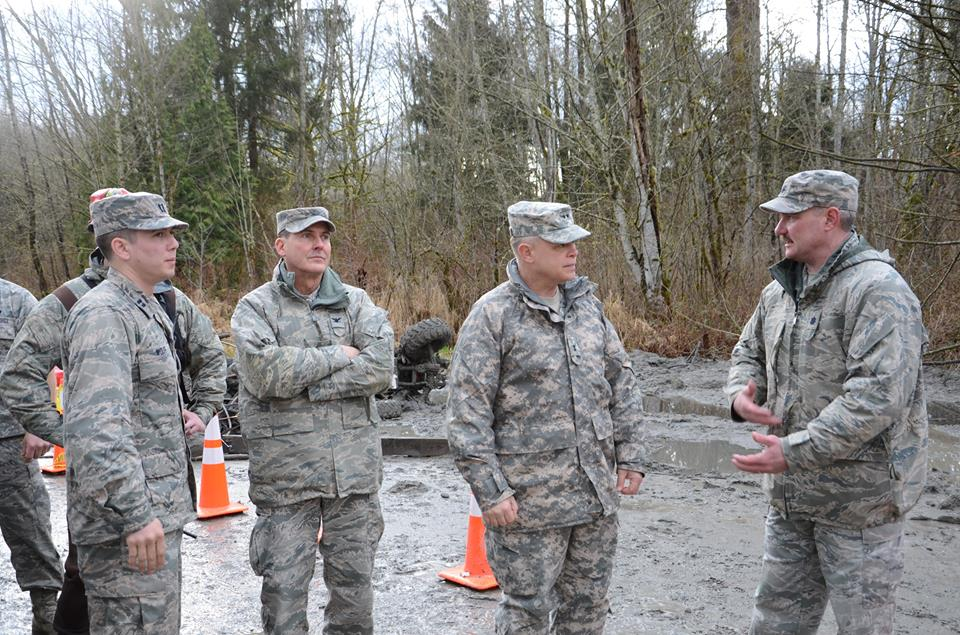
Colonel Tuohy and Major General Daugherty being briefed at the Oso Mudslide, March 2014.

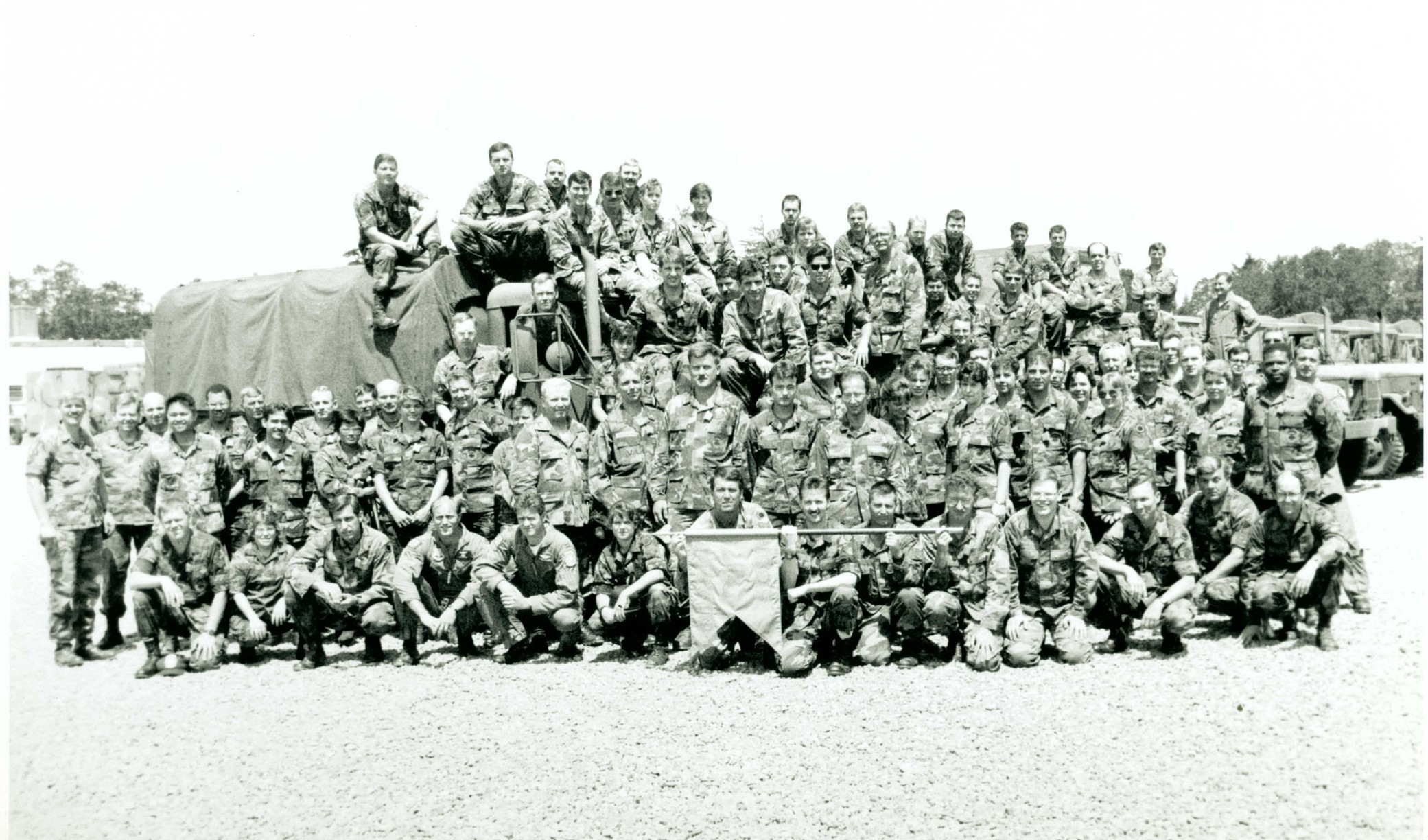
Captain Tuohy (sitting near the truck's smoke stack) with other members of the Washington Air National Guard's 111th Air Support Operations Squadron during annual training at Camp Rilea, Oregon in 1990. Tuohy later went on to command the squadron. The 111th Air Support Operations Squadron deploys to battlefield forward areas and supports multiple services in providing close air support and acts as a liaison between Air Force and Army elements.

General Tuohy has served the following assignments:

1. January 1979 - July 1979, Student, Undergraduate Navigator Training, Mather Air Force Base, California
2. July 1979 - February 1980, Student, Electronic Warfare Officer Training, Mather Air Force Base, California
3. February 1980 - June 1980, Student, Combat Crew Training Course, Castle Air Force Base, California
4. June 1980 - November 1984, Electronic Warfare Officer, B-52, 325th Bombardment Squadron, Fairchild Air Force Base, Washington
5. December 1984 - June 1987, Officer in Charge, Operating Location, Administration, Headquarters Washington Air National Guard, Camp Murray, Washington
6. June 1987 - June 1989, Cost Management Officer, Headquarters Washington Air National Guard, Operating Location BA, Camp Murray, Washington
7. June 1989 - June 1991, Air Operations Officer, 111th Air Support Operations Center Squadron, Camp Murray, Washington
8. June 1991 - June 1992, Fighter Duty Officer, 111th Air Support Operations Center Squadron, Camp Murray, Washington
9. June 1992 - December 1994, Senior Fighter Duty Officer, 111th Air Support Operations Center Squadron, Camp Murray, Washington
10. December 1994 - September 1996, Director of Operations, 111th Air Support Operations Center Squadron, Camp Murray, Washington
11. October 1996 - September 1997, Director of Operations, Headquarters 252d Combat Communications Group, Camp Murray, Washington
12. October 1997 - May 1999, Commander, 111th Air Support Operations Center Squadron, Camp Murray, Washington
13. June 1999 - May 2001, Commander, Detachment 1, Headquarters Washington Air National Guard, Camp Murray, Washington
14. July 2001 - July 2003, Human Resource Officer, Headquarters Washington Air National Guard, Camp Murray, Washington
15. July 2003 - June 2005, Chief of Staff, Joint Force Headquarters, Washington National Guard, Camp Murray, Washington
16. June 2005 - June 2006, Commander, Detachment 1, Headquarters Washington Air National Guard, Camp Murray, Washington
17. June 2006 - June 2008, Commander, 194th Regional Support Wing, Camp Murray, Washington
18. June 2008 - November 2013, United States Property & Fiscal Officer, Camp Murray, Washington
19. November 2013 – August 2017, Commander and Assistant Adjutant General - Air, Headquarters, Washington Air National Guard, Camp Murray, Washington

== Flight information ==
Rating: Navigator

Flight hours: More than 1,200

Aircraft flown: Boeing B-52 Stratofortress, Cessna T-37 Tweet, Boeing T-43

== Education ==
- 1978 Florida State University, Bachelor of Science, Management, Tallahassee, Florida
- 1990 Squadron Officer School, by correspondence
- 1994 Air Command and Staff College, by seminar, McChord AFB, Washington
- Air Ground Operations School, twice Distinguished Graduate
- 1999 Air War College, by correspondence
- 2014 Senior Leader Orientation Course, Joint Base Andrews, Maryland

== Awards and decorations ==
Air Force Distinguished Service Medal
Legion of Merit
Defense Meritorious Service Medal
Meritorious Service Medal (with 2 Bronze Oak Leaf Clusters)
Air Force Commendation Medal (with 1 Bronze Oak Leaf Cluster)
Air Force Outstanding Unit Award (with 1 Bronze Oak Leaf Cluster)
Combat Readiness Medal
National Defense Service Medal (with 1 Bronze Service Star)
Global War on Terrorism Service Medal
Humanitarian Service Medal
Air Force Longevity Service Award (with 1 Silver and 3 Bronze Oak Leaf Clusters)
Armed Forces Reserve Medal (with Gold Hourglass Device and "M" Device)
Small Arms Expert Marksmanship Ribbon (with 1 Bronze Star)
Air Force Training Ribbon
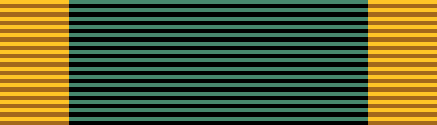
Washington National Guard Distinguished Service Medal (with 1 Bronze Oak Leaf Cluster)
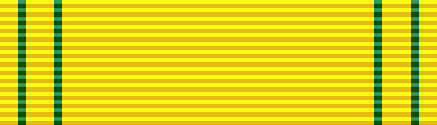
Washington National Guard Emergency Service Ribbon (with 2 Bronze Stars)
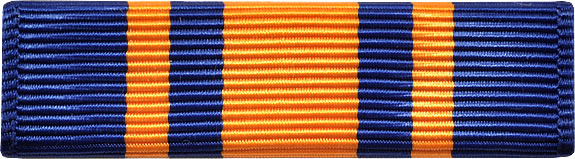
Washington Air National Guard Recruiting and Retention Ribbon (with 1 Bronze Oak Leaf Cluster)

== Effective dates of promotion ==
Rank	Date
Second Lieutenant	13 August 1978
First Lieutenant	8 January 1981
Captain	8 January 1983
Major	2 January 1991
Lieutenant Colonel	7 January 1996
Colonel	6 October 2000
Brigadier General	6 March 2014

== Additional recognitions ==
On 25 Mar 2016, Major General Chaivuth Yuthasilkul, Commanding General, Royal Thai Army Aviation Center presented Brig Gen Tuohy with Royal Thai Army Aviation wings at the Aviation Center in Lop Buri Province, Kingdom of Thailand. The Washington National Guard senior leadership visited the Kingdom as part of the National Guard State Partnership Program.

On 13 Aug 2017, at his retirement ceremony, Brig Gen Tuohy was presented with a Wall of Honor Certificate on behalf of the Washington National Guard JAG Corps, signifying the addition of his name to the Smithsonian National Air and Space Museum Wall of Honor for his impact on military aviation.

== Professional boards, memberships, and affiliations ==
- Washington Youth Academy (a division of the Youth Challenge Program) Board of Directors
- Goodwill Industries of the Olympics and Rainier Region Board of Directors
- Washington National Guard Museum Board of Advisors
- Military Officers Association of America
- National Guard Association of the United States
- National Guard Association of Washington
- Bonner County Sheriff's Office Volunteer Search and Rescue (BCSOVSAR) member
- HonorBound Coffee Board of Directors

Military offices
Preceded by Major General Gary T. Magonigle	Assistant Adjutant General of Washington state and Commander, Washington Air National Guard; 2013-2017	Succeeded by Brigadier General Jeremy Horn
