= 252nd Cyberspace Operations Group =

- Active: 1953 – present
- Country: United States
- Allegiance: Washington
- Branch: Air National Guard
- Type: Cyberspace operations
- Part of: Washington Air National Guard
- Garrison/HQ: Camp Murray, Tacoma, Washington
- Decorations: Air Force Outstanding Unit Award

Insignia
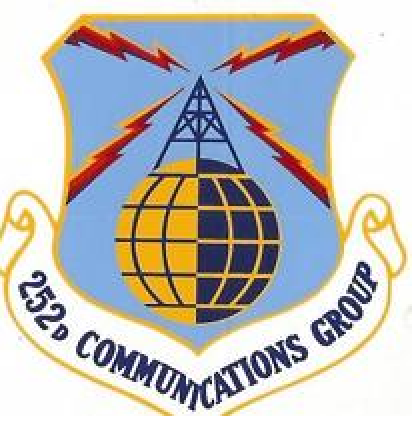
- 252nd Cyberspace Operations Group emblem

The 252nd Cyberspace Operations Group is a unit of the Washington Air National Guard at Joint Base Lewis-McChord, Tacoma, Washington. It is assigned to the 194th Wing. The 252nd has squadrons at Camp Murray and Joint Base Lewis-McChord, and has two geographically separated units at Fairchild Air Force Base.

== Mission ==
The 252nd Cyberspace Operations Group provides highly trained and qualified cyberspace and intelligence professionals to combatant commanders. They ensure squadrons are trained and evaluated in order to be mission-ready to support cyber, intelligence and expeditionary communications missions. They also provide oversight for cyberspace and intelligence operational forces in direct support of Air Combat Command, Air Force Space Command, the Air Force Intelligence, Surveillance, and Reconnaissance Agency and United States Cyber Command. The 252nd Cyberspace Operations Group provides citizen airmen to support domestic cyber operations, cyber intelligence support to federal and state law enforcement agencies, and provides cyber mission planning and command element in support of combatant commanders for worldwide contingency operations.

== History ==
The 252nd Communications Group was activated at Geiger Field in Spokane, Washington, on 1 April 1953. It was redesignated as the 252nd Communications Group (Mobile) in October 1960. In March 1962, the 252nd relocated from Geiger Field to the Four Lakes Communications Station, a former Nike missile site near Cheney, Washington. In June 1971, the 252nd closed operations at Four Lakes and moved to Paine Air National Guard Base in Everett, Washington.

== Lineage ==
- Established as the 252nd Communications Group on 1 April 1953

Redesignated 252nd Communications Group (Mobile) on 1 October 1960
Redesignated 252nd Mobile Communications Group on 16 March 1968
Redesignated 252nd Combat Communications Group on 1 April 1976
Redesignated 252nd Combat Information Systems Group on 1 July 1985
Redesignated 252nd Combat Communications Group on 1 October 1986
Redesignated 252nd Cyberspace Operations Group c. April 2015

=== Assignments ===
- Washington Air National Guard, 1 April 1953
- 194th Regional Support Wing (later 194th Wing), 30 August 2006 – present

Gaining command
Air Force Communications Service (later Air Force Communications Command, Air Force Information Systems Command, Air Force Communications Command), 1968-1990
Tactical Air Command, 1953-1068, 1990-1992
Air Combat Command, 1992-2009
Air Force Space Command, 2009-2018
Air Combat Command, 2018-present

=== Components ===
Squadrons

- 143rd Communications Squadron (later 143rd Mobile Communications Squadron, 143rd Combat Communications Squadron, 143rd Combat Informations Systems Squadron, 143rd Combat Communications Squadron, 143rd Information Operations Squadron, 143rd Cyberspace Operations Squadron), 16 March 1968 – present
- 194th Intelligence Squadron
- 214th Communications Construction Squadron, 1 April 1953 – 1954
- 215th Communications Construction Squadron (later 215th Electronics Installation Squadron, 215th Engineering and Installation Squadron) (at Paine Air National Guard Base), 1 June 1953 – 1 January 1959, 1 May 1970 – by 2012
- 221st Mobile Communications Squadron, 15 March 1968 – April 1971
- 221st Radio Relay Squadron, 1 January 1963 – 15 March 1968
- 222nd Radio Relay Squadron, 1 April 1953 – 1 September 1960
- 242nd Mobile Communications Squadron (later 242nd Combat Communications Squadron, 242nd Combat Information Systems Squadron) (at Fairchild Air Force Base), 1 June 1961 – present
- 244th Mobile Communications Squadron (later 244th Combat Communications Flight, 244th Combat Information Systems Squadron, 244th Combat Communications Squadron), 15 March 1968 – 2006
- 244th Radio Relay Squadron, 1961 – 15 March 1968
- 256th Mobile Communications Squadron (later 256th Combat Communications Squadron, 256th Combat Information /Systems Squadron, 256th Combat Communications Squadron, 256th Intelligence Squadron) (at Fairchild Air Force Base), 19 June 1971 – present
- 262nd Communications Squadron (later 262nd Mobile Communications Squadron, 262nd Combat Communications Squadron, 262nd Combat Information Systems Squadron, 262nd Combat Communications Squadron, 262nd Information Warfare Aggressor Squadron, 262nd Network Warfare Squadron, 262nd Cyberspace Operations Squadron) (at Joint Base Lewis-McChord), 1 April 1953 – present

Flights

- 233rd Mobile Communications Flight (later 233rd Flight Facilities Flight), 1 June 1961 – 7 December 1971
- 244th Combat Communications Flight (see 244th Mobile Communications Squadron)

=== Stations ===
- Geiger Field, Spokane, Washington, 1953-1962
- Four Lakes Communications Station, Cheney, Washington 1962-1971
- Paine Air National Guard Base, Everett, Washington, 1971-2013
- Camp Murray, Tacoma, Washington, ???-present

=== Commanders ===
- Colonel Steven Hilsdon (c. 2012)
- Colonel Chas Jeffries (2012-2017)
- Colonel Kenneth Borchers (2017-2020)
- Colonel Robert Siau (2020–2022)
- Colonel Thomas Pries (2022-2024)
- Colonel Jack Johnson (2024-present)

=== Decorations ===
- Air Force Outstanding Unit Award

== See also ==
- List of cyber warfare forces
