= 256th Intelligence Squadron =

- Active: 1971–present
- Country: United States
- Allegiance: Washington
- Branch: Air National Guard
- Type: Intelligence
- Part of: Washington Air National Guard
- Garrison/HQ: Fairchild Air Force Base, Spokane, Washington

The 256th Intelligence Squadron (256 IS) is a unit of the Washington Air National Guard at Fairchild Air Force Base, Spokane, Washington. It is a geographically separate unit (GSU) assigned to the 252d Combat Communications Group at Camp Murray, Washington. Prior to converting to an intelligence mission, the 256th was a combat communications squadron.

== History ==
The 256th Mobile Communications Squadron was activated in 1971 at Paine Air National Guard Base in Everett, Washington. In 1976, the squadron relocated to Camp Murray near Tacoma, Washington. In 1980, the 256th was recognized by Governor Dixy Lee Ray for supporting the recovery efforts following the 1980 eruption of Mount St. Helens. The unit was redesignated as the 256th Combat Communications Squadron in 1984. Several 256th personnel deployed to Saudi Arabia during the 1991 Gulf War.

In 1996, the 256th relocated to the Four Lakes Communications Station, a former Nike missile site near Cheney, Washington. The unit took over facilities formerly used by the 105th Air Control Squadron, which was inactivated at the same time. The 2005 Base Realignment and Closure Commission determined that Four Lakes should close and that the 256th should relocated to the nearby Fairchild Air Force Base. The move to Fairchild was completed in 2009. Before relocating, the 256th deployed to Iraq as part of the Iraq War.

After the move to Fairchild, the 256th began conversion to an intelligence mission, and it was redesignated as the 256th Intelligence Squadron in 2013.

== Lineage ==
- Constituted as the 256th Mobile Communications Squadron (Air Force Component Command Post) on 22 February 1971 and allotted to the Air National Guard

Activated on 19 June 1971
Redesignated 256th Mobile Communications Squadron (Air Force Component Headquarters) on 15 November 1972
Redesignated 256th Combat Communications Squadron (Air Force Component Headquarters) on 1 April 1976
Redesignated 256th Combat Information Systems Squadron c. 1 July 1984
Redesignated 256th Combat Communications Squadron c. 1 October 1986
Redesignated 256th Intelligence Squadron in 2013

=== Assignments ===
- 252d Mobile Communications Group (later, 252d Combat Communications Group), 1971–present
- Washington Air National Guard, 1971–present

Gained by Air Force Communications Command, 1981-1990
Gained by Tactical Air Command, 1990-1992
Gained by Air Combat Command, 1992-2009
Gained by Air Force Space Command, 2009-2013
Gained by Air Force Intelligence, Surveillance and Reconnaissance Agency, 2013-present

=== Stations ===
- Paine Air National Guard Base, 1971-1976
- Camp Murray, 1976-1996
- Four Lakes Communications Station, Cheney, Washington, 1996-2009
- Fairchild Air Force Base, Washington, 2009–present

== See also ==
- List of United States Air Force intelligence squadrons
