= Washington State Military Department =

Branch of state government in Washington, US

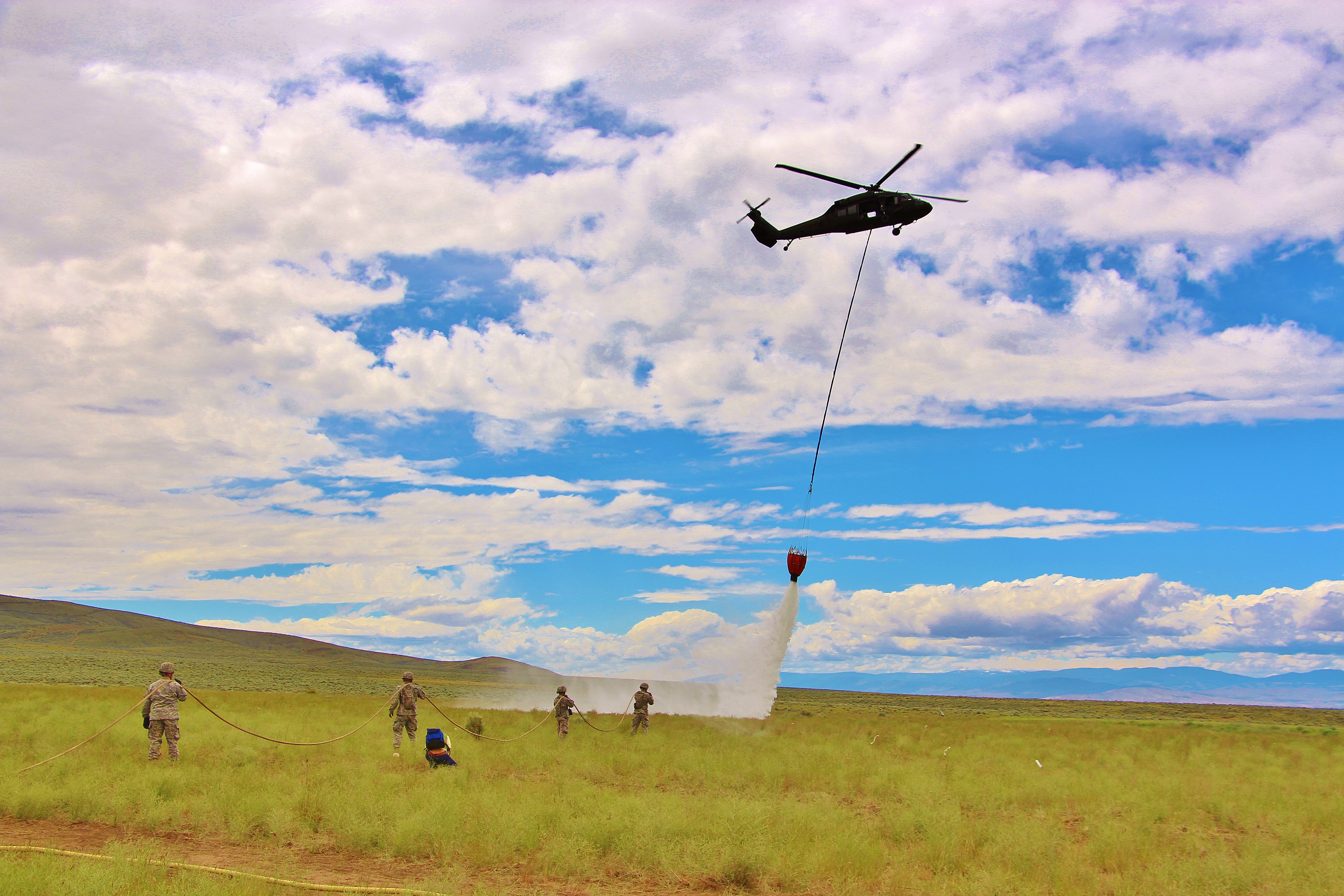
The Washington National Guard is trained to fight forest fires.

The Washington State Military Department is a branch of the state government of Washington, United States.

The Washington State Military Department has several major operational divisions:

- Washington Emergency Management Division - Leads state-level mitigation, in response and recovery. The Washington Emergency Division coordinates with local, federal, and non-profit organizations.
- Washington Army National Guard- Provides trained units to mobilize anywhere within Washington State. Part of The U.S. Army to perform missions like disaster response, civil support, and assists Homeland Security.
- Washington Air National Guard - Provides airlift, cyber intelligence, and used in missions both federal and state.
- Washington State Guard- Professional services that support department operations.
- Washington Youth Academy- Resilience structure programs.
- Washington Wing Civil Air Patrol- Volunteer emergency services, youth development, and aerospace education program.
- State & Federal Support Services-Provides administrative, financial, logistical support to personal and facilities.

These divisions use state and federal resources to perform homeland defense, homeland security, and emergency mitigation, preparedness, response and recovery activities.

Since June 29, 2024, Major General Gent Walsh has been the adjutant general, director of the Washington Military Department and homeland security advisor to the governor.

The Washington State Military Department partnerships: Tribal governments, local jurisdictions, federal agencies (FEMA, DoD), non-profit organizations, and international exchange programs through the National Guard State Partnership Program. The funding is composed of state appropriations, federal reimbursements, and grants used by the National Guard, and emergency management programs. The department's newest annual reports provided personnel counts, program spending, and capital investments for readiness centers and emergency infrastructure.

== Washington State Emergency Operations Center ==
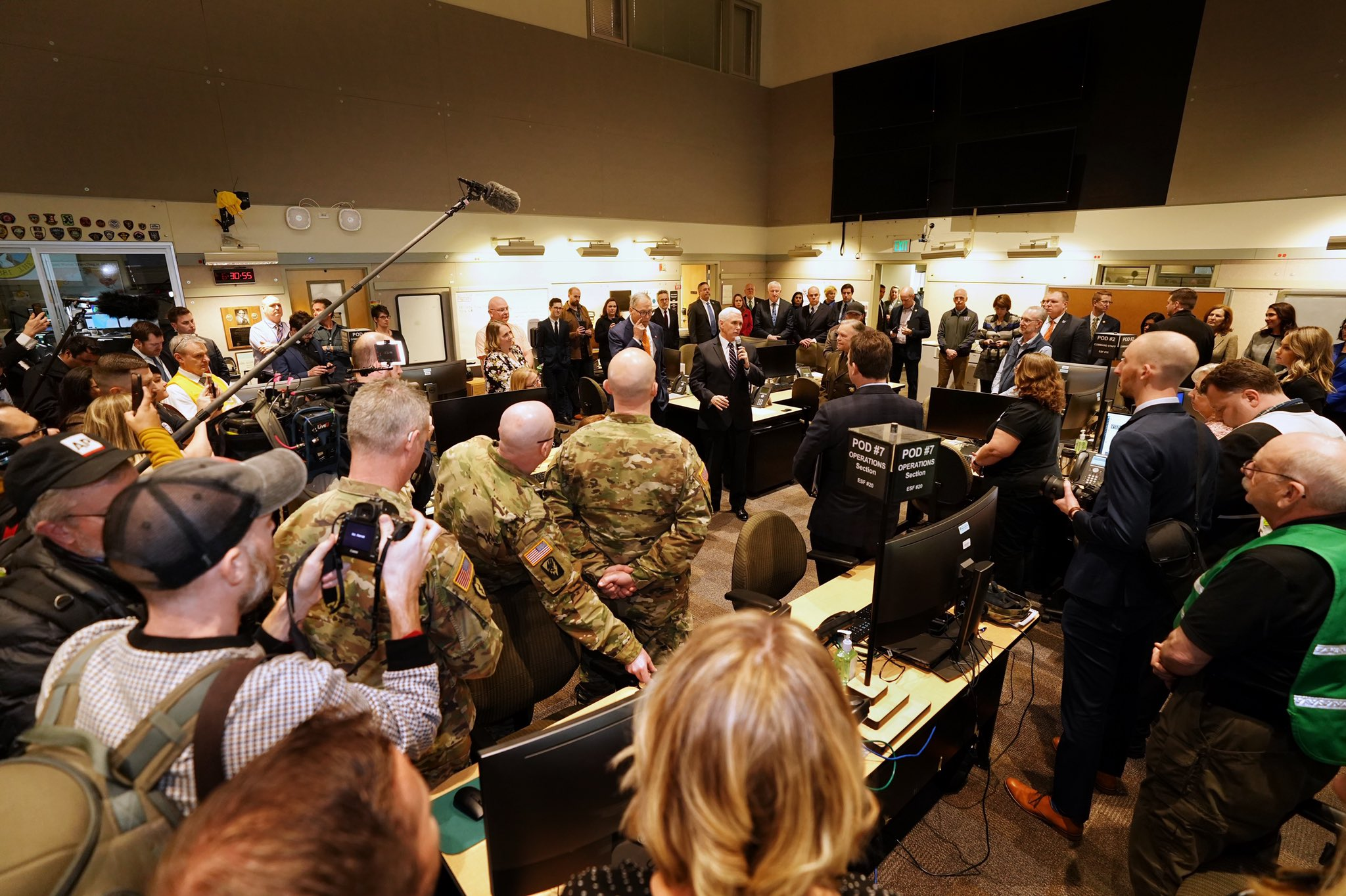
United States Vice President Mike Pence at Washington State Emergency Operations Center during the 2020 coronavirus pandemic

The Washington State Emergency Operations Center is a cabinet-level agency. Its task is to organize and support emergency management, and assist with Homeland Security operations. Headquarters located at Camp Murray in Pierce County by Joint Base Lewis-McChord, which includes the Military Department's Emergency Management Division. The 28,000 square foot facility, occupied since mid 1998, is built on rollers to withstand earthquakes. The Emergency Operations Center was activated for the 2012 Washington wildfires, 2015 Washington wildfires, 2016 Washington wildfires, 2018 Washington wildfires, and for the 2020 coronavirus pandemic.

== See also ==
- Washington Naval Militia
