= 194th Intelligence Squadron =

- 194th Intelligence Squadron emblem
- Active: 2006 – present
- Country: United States
- Branch: Air National Guard/ United States Air Force
- Garrison/HQ: Camp Murray, Washington

The 194th Intelligence Squadron is an intelligence unit of the United States Air Force It was activated in 2006. Its parent unit is the 194th Regional Support Wing.

== Mission ==
The 194 IS provides tailored target and geospatial intelligence to the Air Component to enable precision engagement and effective operations. Providing Aimpoint Development, Precise Point Mensuration, Weaponeering, and Collateral Damage Assessment, the 194 IS has quickly become one of the premier combat targeting intelligence units in the nation.

== Assignments ==
=== Major Command/Gaining Command ===
- Air National Guard/Air Combat Command (2006 – present)

== Previous designations ==
- 194th Intelligence Squadron (2006 – present)

== Bases stationed ==
- Camp Murray (2006 – present)

== Decorations ==
- Air Force Outstanding Unit Award (1 November 2005 – 31 October 2007)
