= Washington National Guard Museum =

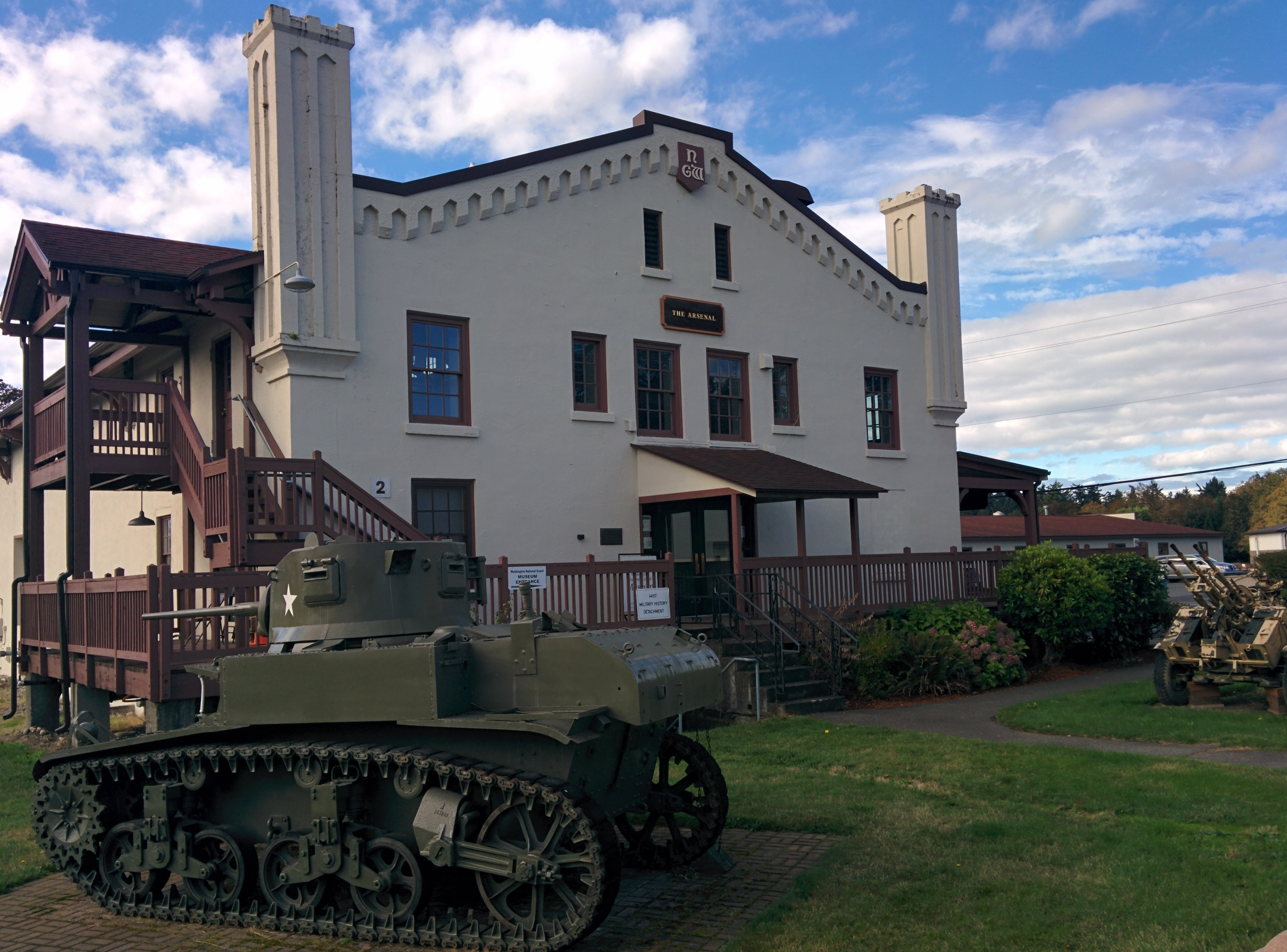
- Museum in 2014

- The present museum building in Washington state Washington National Guard Museum (the United States)
- Established: 1989
- Location: Building #2 (The Arsenal); Camp Murray, Washington
- Coordinates: 47.1150°N 122.5647°W
- Type: Military museum
- Website: Official website

The Washington National Guard Museum, also known as The Arsenal Museum, is a military museum of the Washington National Guard. It is located at the Washington National Guard headquarters at Camp Murray, visible from Interstate 5 near Lakewood, Washington.

== Collection ==
The collection includes (inside) military artifacts and memorabilia including National Guard weapons, uniforms and diaries, and outside, static displays including an M47 Patton tank, F-101 Voodoo jet fighter, and AH-1 Cobra attack helicopter.

== The Arsenal ==
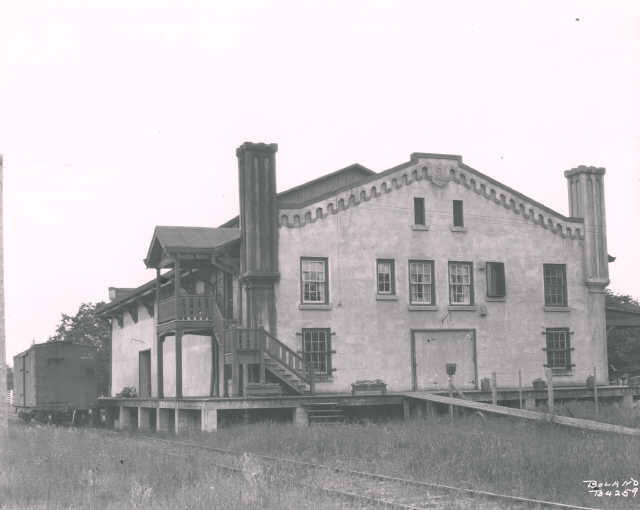
The Arsenal, 1921. Tacoma Public Library Boland Collection

The building housing the museum, The Arsenal, was built in 1915–1916. It predates the nearby Lewis Army Museum, just as the National Guard's Camp Murray is a generation older than the adjacent and larger Fort Lewis (now Joint Base Lewis-McChord).
