= Bret D. Daugherty =

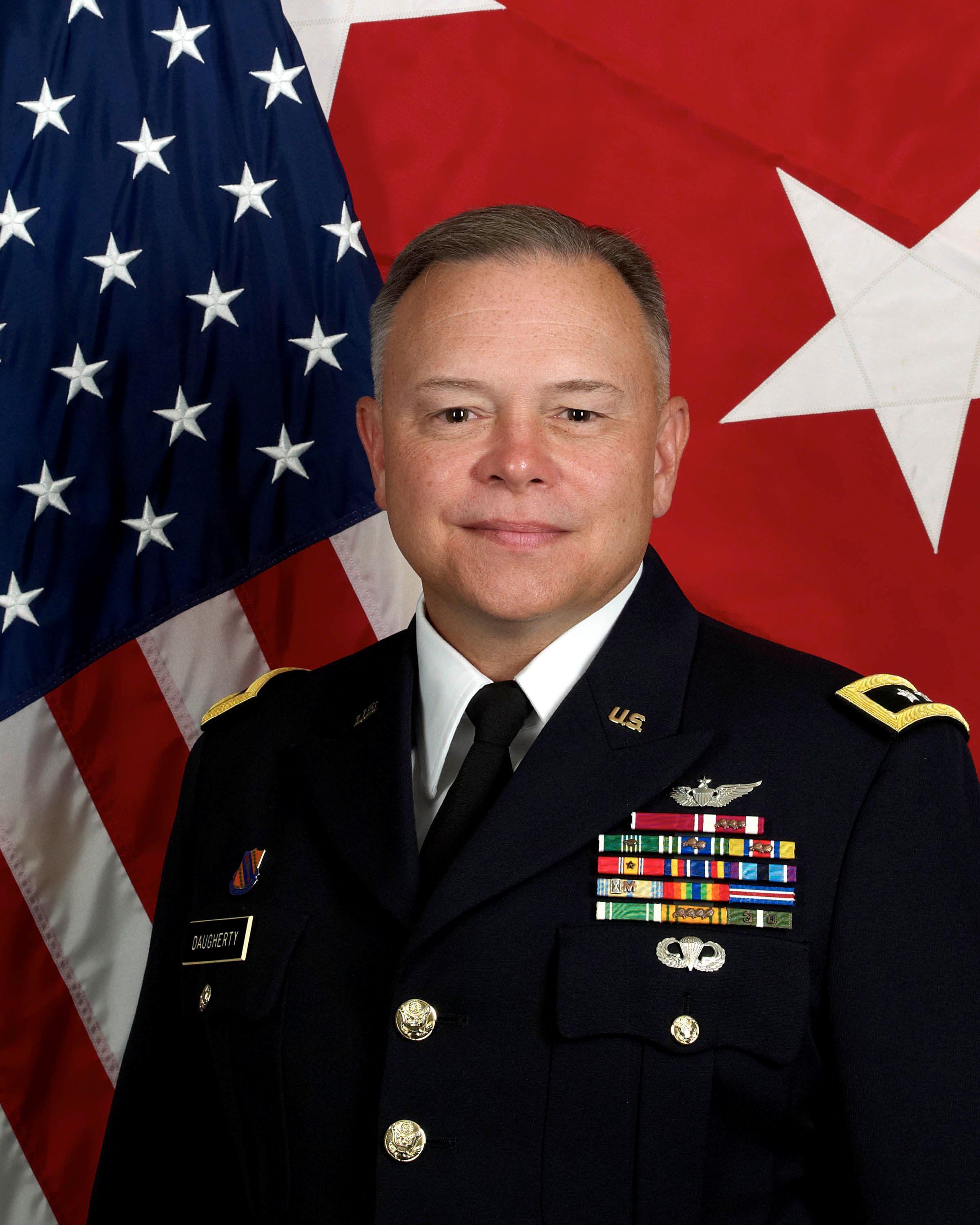
- Military career
- Allegiance: United States
- Branch: Army National Guard
- Service years: 1980–2024
- Rank: Major general
- Unit: Washington National Guard
- Awards: Legion of Merit, United States Aviator Badge

Bret D. Daugherty is a retired major general and the former adjutant general of Washington state. In this role, he was the commander of the entire Washington National Guard, including both the Washington Army National Guard and the Washington Air National Guard. He was previously assistant adjutant general under Timothy Lowenberg (from 2009 to 2012).

== Military career ==
Daugherty began his military service in the Reserve Officers Training Corps (ROTC) program at Seattle University. He graduated in 1980 with a bachelor's degree in psychology and served the following nine years on active duty as an attack helicopter trainee, pilot, and platoon leader. He then transferred to the Washington Army National Guard, where he held high positions in the 66th Theater Aviation Command. Along the way, he earned a Master of Public Administration (MPA) from Seattle University in 1989, a Master of Science in Strategic Studies from the United States Army War College in 2000, and a certificate from the Command and General Staff College. From 2005 to 2008, he served as the Commander of the 205th Regiment (Leadership). From 2008 to 2009, he served as the Commander of the 66th Theater Aviation Command. He is classified as a Senior Army Aviator.

Political offices
Preceded by Timothy Lowenberg	Adjutant General of Washington state 2012–2024	Succeeded by Gent Welsh Jr.
