= Jill Lannan =

US Air Force general

Jill Lannan is a brigadier general in the Air National Guard.

== Career ==
Lannan was commissioned an officer in the United States Army in 1985. She was a Distinguished Graduate of the Army Reserve Officers' Training Corps. Afterwards, she underwent training at Fort Huachuca and was assigned to the 25th Infantry Division. She would serve with the 9th Infantry Division and I Corps before joining the Washington Air National Guard in 1993.

From 2009 to 2013, Lannan was Vice Commander of the 194th Regional Support Wing. In 2013, it was changed to the 194th Wing and she became Commander, holding the position until 2015. That year, she served as Chief of Staff of the Washington Air National Guard before being assigned to the Twenty-Fourth Air Force.

Awards she has received include the Legion of Merit, the Meritorious Service Medal with six oak leaf clusters, the Air Force Commendation Medal with oak leaf cluster, the Army Commendation Medal, the National Defense Service Medal with service star, the Global War on Terrorism Service Medal, the Army Overseas Service Ribbon, the Armed Forces Reserve Medal with hourglass device and the Air Force Outstanding Unit Award with two oak leaf clusters.

== Education ==
- St. Norbert College
- Saint Martin's University
- Squadron Officer School
- Air Command and Staff College
- Air War College
- Capstone Military Leadership Program
