= Washington National Guard =

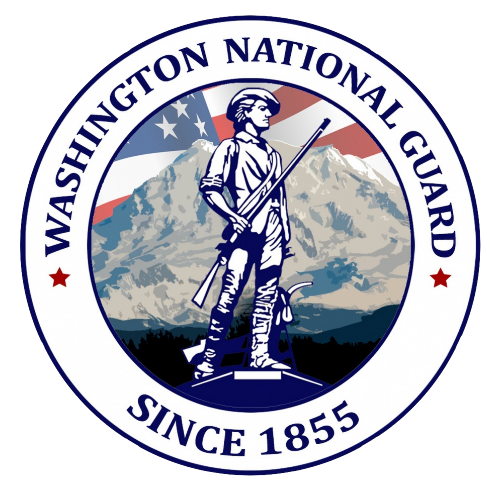
- Seal of the Washington National Guard
- Active: As exclusively state militias: 1855–1933; As dual state-federal reserve forces: 1933–present
- Country: United States of America
- Allegiance: State (32 U.S.C.); Federal (10 U.S.C. § E)
- Branch: United States Army and United States Air Force
- Role: State militia/Reserve force
- Size: 8,200 personnel
- Part of: National Guard Bureau; Washington Military Department
- Garrison/HQ: Washington State
- Nicknames: Air Guard; Army Guard
- Mottos: "Safe Guarding Lives and Property"
- Website: https://www.mil.wa.gov

Commanders
- Current commander: Major General Gent Welsh, USA

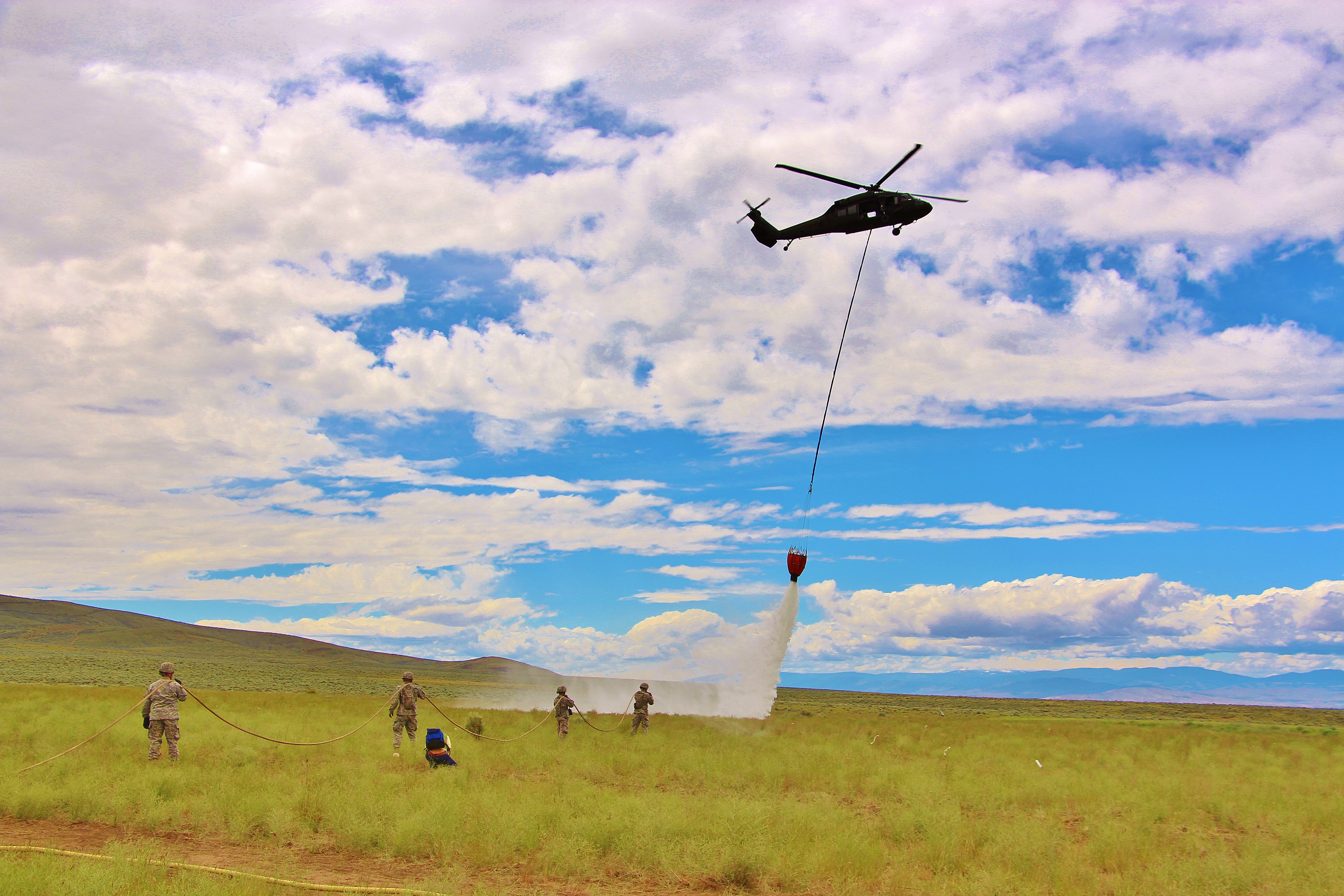
Washington National Guardsmen training to fight forest fires

The Washington National Guard is one of the four elements of the State of Washington's Washington Military Department and a component of the National Guard of the United States. It is headquartered at Camp Murray, Washington, and is defined by its state and federal mission. At the call of the governor, the Washington National Guard will mobilize and deploy during times of state emergency to augment local jurisdictions and responders in their efforts to protect lives and property. The Washington National Guard is also subject to the call of the president of the United States to serve as part of the total U.S. Military force.

== Makeup ==
The Washington National Guard is made up of the Washington Army National Guard (WAARNG) and the Washington Air National Guard (WA ANG). The WAARNG is a reserve component of the U.S. Army and the WA ANG is a reserve component of the U.S. Air Force. There are approximately 8,400 citizen-soldiers and airmen serving in the Washington National Guard (6,300 in the WAARNG and 2,100 in the WA ANG).

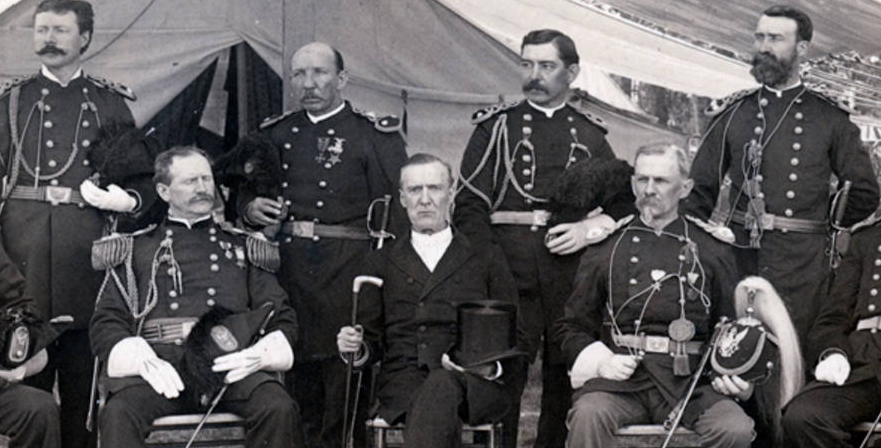
Military leaders of the Washington National Guard pictured at Camp Murray in 1892; in the center is Governor Elisha Ferry.

== Washington Army National Guard ==
The WAARNG is made up of five Major Subordinate Commands: 81st Brigade Combat Team (headquartered in Seattle), 96th Troop Command (headquartered in Tacoma), 56th Information Operations Brigade (headquartered at Joint Base Lewis-McChord), 96th Aviation Troop Command (headquartered at Joint Base Lewis-McChord), and the 205th Leadership Regiment (headquartered at Camp Murray).

== Washington Air National Guard ==
The Washington Air National Guard is made up of two Wings and an Air Defense Sector: 141st Air Refueling Wing (headquartered at Fairchild Air Force Base in Spokane) 194th Wing (headquartered at Camp Murray) Western Air Defense Sector (headquartered at Joint Base Lewis-McChord)

In 1853 President Millard Fillmore signed the Organic Act creating the Washington Territory and appointing Major Isaac Stevens the first governor and commander-in-chief of the Territorial Militia. The Territorial Militia organized in 1855 and supported the Territorial Government, provided defense against Indian uprisings and sent a unit to fight for the Union in the Civil War. The Washington National Guard trained as completely uniformed and equipped force for the first time in 1890 on the shores of American Lake near Tacoma.

Units of the Washington National Guard served in the Philippine Insurrection, both World Wars, the Berlin Airlift and the first Gulf War. Since the September 11 attacks in 2001, the Washington National Guard units have served in support of Operation Noble Eagle, Operation Iraqi Freedom and Operation Enduring Freedom. Approximately 700 members of the Washington National Guard served in support of the Hurricane Katrina Relief Mission in the Gulf Coast, and more than 300 served in support of Operation Jump Start (the southwest border mission from September 2006 – June 2008).

The citizen soldiers and airmen of The Washington National Guard are dedicated to the mission of safeguarding lives and property in Washington State in serving in the US and overseas. Members come from a wide diversity of communities, professions and backgrounds from around the State of Washington.

== Washington National Guard historical timeline ==
=== 1853 ===
President Fillmore signed the Organic Act creating the Washington Territory and Maj. Issac Stevens was appointed first governor and commander-in-chief of the Territorial Militia (the beginnings of the Washington National Guard).

=== 1855–1858 ===
Washington Territorial Militia members informally mustered in support of the Territorial government involving local Indian uprisings.

=== 1862–1865 ===
Washington Territorial Militia members formed into the "1st Washington Territory Infantry" and brought into service for the Civil War.

=== 1885 ===
Washington Territory Militia "officially" formed and recognized as the Washington National Guard in the Legislative Assembly of Washington Territory.

=== 1889 ===
On November 11, 1889, Washington became a state.

=== 1890 ===
State Legislature met and appropriated $20,319.33 for a "Brigade Encampment" to be held that summer. Completely uniformed and equipped for the first time, the Washington State National Guard trained on the shores of American Lake near Tacoma.

=== 1890–1898 ===
Washington National Guard members involved in additional Indian conflicts, civil unrest, riots and fire fighting.

=== 1898–1899 ===
Washington National Guard members called into Federal Service during the Philippine Insurrection.

=== 1916 ===
Washington National Guard members involved in Mexican Border dispute.

=== 1917–1918 ===
Washington National Guard members Federalized for service in World War I.

=== 1919–1940 ===
Washington National Guard members involved in civil disturbance, labor conflicts, flooding assistance and fire fighting.

=== 1941–1945 ===
Nearly 12,000 Washington National Guard members were inducted into Federal Service at the beginning of World War II.

=== 1946–1960 ===
Washington National Guard members involved in civil disturbance, labor conflicts, flooding assistance, fire fighting.

=== 1961 ===
Washington National Guard members activated for the Berlin Crisis and the Berlin Airlift.

=== 1962–1979 ===
Washington National Guard members involved in flooding assistance, fire fighting.

=== 1980 ===
More than 2,000 members of the Washington National Guard are called to state active duty when Mount St. Helens erupted.

=== 1981–1990 ===
Washington National Guard members involved in assistance to law enforcement, search and rescue, emergency recovery, flood assistance, etc.

=== 1990–1991 ===
Washington National Guard members activated in support of Operations Desert Shield/Desert Storm (Gulf War 1).

=== 1991–1996 ===
Washington National Guard members serve in support of state missions involving winter storms, flooding assistance, fire fighting, etc.

=== 1997 ===
Washington National Guard members deployed to Bosnia in Federal Active service as part of Operation Joint Guardian.

=== 1998 ===
Civil unrest at WSU campus and at the Makah Indian Reservation in the first dispute regarding whaling in over a hundred years.

=== 1999 ===
Assistance to Law Enforcement – World Trade Organization Conference civil unrest on the streets of Seattle. Washington National Guard members deployed to Kosovo in Federal Active service as part of Operation Joint Guardian.

=== 2000 ===
Washington National Guard members deployed to Macedonia in Federal Active service as part of Operation Joint Guardian.

=== 2001 ===
Washington National Guard members involved in wild land fire fighting.

=== 2001–2002 ===
In response to the September 11 attacks, Washington National Guard members began to be deployed in the U.S. and around world in support Operations Noble Eagle (United States) and Enduring Freedom (Afghanistan) including Washington's regional airports, the northern border with Canada, the Olympic Games and the search for terrorists in the Afghan mountains.

=== 2003–Present ===
Since September 11, 2001 more than 13,000 citizen soldiers and airmen have served in support of Operation Iraqi Freedom (Iraq, Kuwait, Qatar, Saudi Arabia), Operation Enduring Freedom/Freedom's Sentinel (Afghanistan, Philippines, Cuba, Djibouti (Horn of Africa), Korea, Uzbekistan), and Operation Inherent Resolve (Qatar, Kuwait, Iraq, Syria). Nearly 900 Washington Guardsmen have served in support domestic operations of Noble Eagle within the United States to include Airport Security, Border Patrol, security at military bases, and miscellaneous missions in Bosnia, Germany, Egypt and Kuwait.

=== 2005 ===
As a result of Hurricanes Katrina and Rita, over 750 Washington Guard pilots, mechanics, supply and admin specialists, truck drivers and many others supported Humanitarian Relief efforts in Louisiana, Mississippi and Alabama.

=== 2006 ===
The 194th Regional Support Wing, later redesignated as the 194th Wing, was formed within the Washington Air National Guard, bringing together existing Air Guard units including the 252nd Combat Communications Group, air support operations units, mission support units, and a medical support unit into one wing.

=== 2007 ===
Nearly 500 citizen soldiers and airmen served on state active duty in the aftermath of the December 2 storm and subsequent flooding in Southwest Washington. Missions focused on evacuating stranded residents, door-to-door health and welfare checks, transportation of vital supplies and provision of generators.

=== 2009 ===
Nearly 550 citizen soldiers and airmen responded statewide to battle snow and flooding. The eastern Washington mission focused on snow removal from roads and public school buildings, while western Washington missions focused on evacuating stranded residents, door-to-door health and welfare checks, transportation of vital supplies.

=== 2011 ===
Based on recommendations in the Department of Defense's Quadrennial Defense Review, in 2011 the National Guard Bureau established the first two, of later ten, Homeland Response Forces (HRF) in Washington and Ohio. These HRFs are 560-person Chemical, Biological, Radiological, Nuclear, high-yield Explosive (CBRNE) task forces established to support local, state and federal emergency managers in response to CBRNE disasters, or deliberate acts, and additional HAZMAT-related hazards. The Washington HRF's area of responsibility is FEMA Region 10 and has been dubbed the 10th HRF. Nine other HRFs exist across the country with identical alignment by respective FEMA regions. The predominant force provider for this capability is the Army Guard's 96th Troop Command, whose commander holds two roles as both the HRF and Troop Command Commander, however other Army Guard and Air Guard forces combine with the 96th's to constitute the full task force.

=== 2014 ===
More than 620 citizen soldiers and airmen responded to the State Route 530 slide near Oso, WA. The mission focused on assisting in the Search and Rescue efforts after the mile long mud slide that killed 41 people and caused millions in damage.

Approximately 250 soldiers have been activated and deployed to assist firefighters in containing multiple wildfires across the State of Washington.

=== 2020 ===
Washington State Governor Jay Inslee authorized sending more than 600 citizen soldiers to King County to control an outbreak of "destructive protests and looting" in response to the murder of George Floyd. On May 31, the National Guard was activated statewide.

In addition, more than 2,500 soldiers were activated for the COVID-19 response, working in hospitals, off-site immunization clinics, food banks, building tests kits, working in Employment Security and more.

=== 2021 ===
Washington State Governor Jay Inslee authorized sending 373 service-members to Washington, D.C. to assist with security at the Inauguration of Joe Biden in response to the 2021 storming of the United States Capitol by supporters of the outgoing President, Donald Trump.

=== 2024 ===
On Friday, November 1, 2024, Washington State Governor Jay Inslee activated the National Guard on standby status as a precautionary measure against election-related violence. The activation was effective Monday, November 4th through Thursday, November 7th.

=== 2025 ===
Washington governor, Bob Ferguson authorized the National Guard to assist with evacuation efforts. This mobilization was due to the flooding in Western Washington.

== Museum ==
The Washington National Guard Museum, "The Arsenal", is located in its own building at the WANG headquarters at Camp Murray.

== See also ==
- Washington Army National Guard
- Washington Air National Guard
- Washington State Guard
- Washington Military Department
