= 66th Theater Aviation Command =

66th Aviation Command
- 66th Aviation Command shoulder sleeve insignia
- Active: 2008 - 2017
- Country: United States
- Allegiance: United States Army
- Type: Aviation brigade
- Role: Aviation
- Size: Brigade
- Garrison/HQ: JBLM
- Motto(s): "Speed, Power, Courage"

Commanders
- Last Commander: BG Bruce Linton
- Notable commanders: Bret D. Daugherty

Insignia
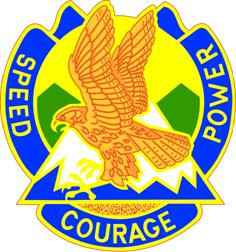
- Distinctive unit insignia

The 66th Theater Aviation Command of the Washington Army National Guard was one of only two such one-star (Brigadier General) commanded aviation commands 2007-2017. The other being the 11th TAC of the USAR. Prior to the 66th TAC designation, during the period 1986-2007, was previously designated as a Corp Aviation Brigade (I Corps), with its guidon based at Gray Army Airfield (KGRF), Joint Base Lewis-McChord, Wash. It included 1-168th General Support Aviation Battalion. The 66th TAC was composed of two Theater Aviation Brigades (the 185th Aviation Brigade (MS ARNG) and the 449th Aviation Brigade (NC ARNG) and the 204th Theater Aviation Operations Group.

The 185th Aviation Brigade (General Support/MSARNG) was composed of 3-135 Aviation, 1-169 Aviation, 1-171 Aviation, and the 351st Aviation Support Battalion.

The 449th Aviation Brigade (Air Assault/NCARNG) was composed of 1-126 Aviation and the 1-244 Aviation.

Due to Army force restructuring following the end of OIF and OEF, the 66th TAC "Falcon Command" deactivated its headquarters and retired its colors in 2017 and its subordinate aviation units were task organized under the 96th Aviation Troop Command of the Wash. Army National Guard headquartered at Camp Murray, Wash.
