= Washington Wing Civil Air Patrol =

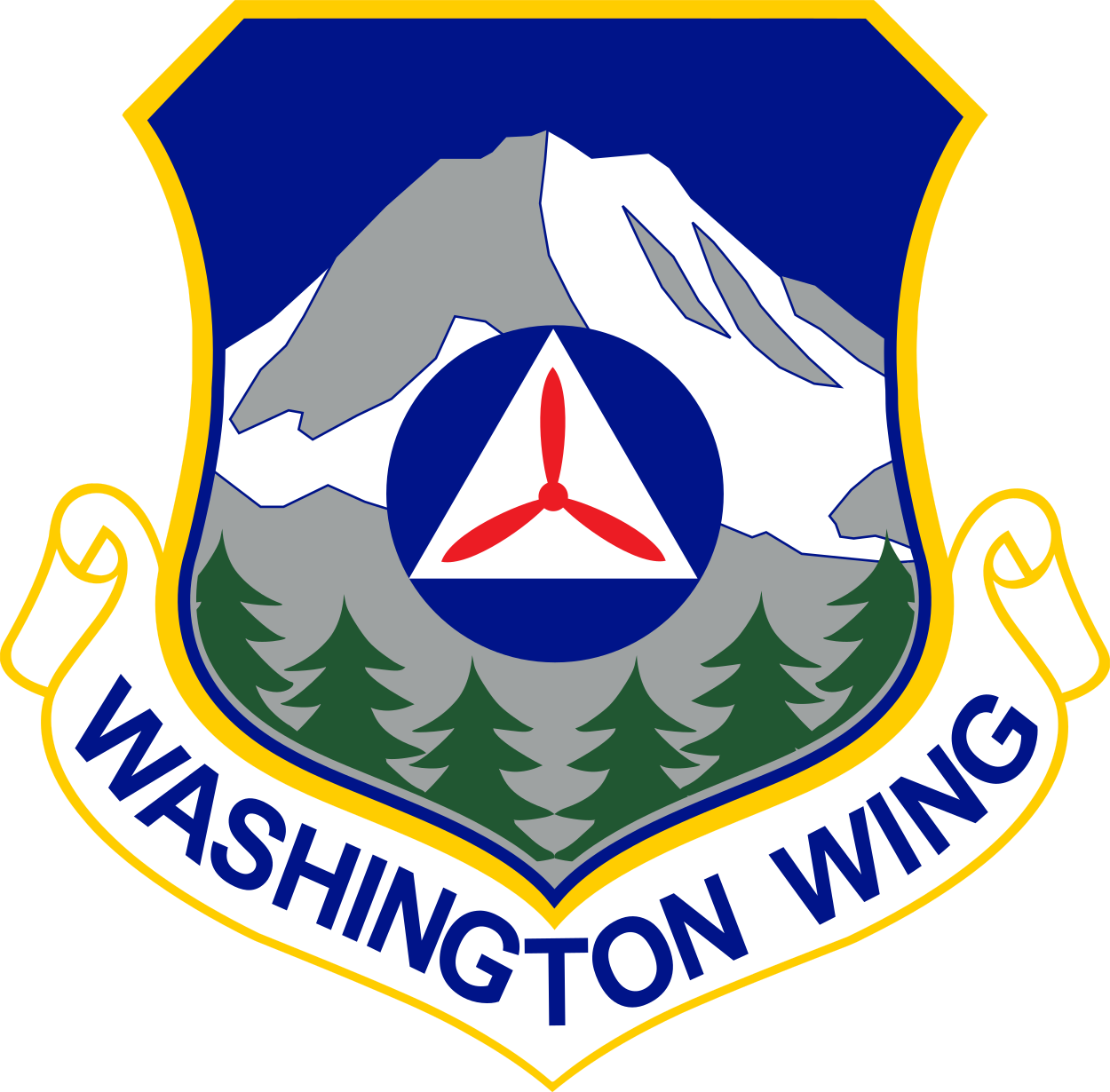
- Washington Wing of Civil Air Patrol

Associated branches
- United States Air Force

Command staff
- Commander: Col Sid Wiggs
- Deputy Commander: Lt Col Clay Shepherd
- Chief of Staff: Lt Col Russell Garlow

Current statistics
- Cadets: 1070
- Seniors: 841
- Total Membership: 1911
- Website: wawg.cap.gov
- Statistics as of 07 July 2025

The Civil Air Patrol's Washington Wing (abbreviated WAWG) is the highest echelon of the Civil Air Patrol in the state of Washington. Its headquarters are located in Pierce County, Washington, at McChord Field at Joint Base Lewis–McChord near Tacoma, Washington. Washington Wing oversees 27 primary subordinate squadrons located throughout the state.

Locally, Washington Wing Civil Air Patrol members operate a fleet of 23 vehicles and 14 aircraft (Cessna 172s, 182s, and a 206, as well as 2 Blanik gliders) for inland search and rescue missions and cadet orientation flight instruction. Washington members contributed a value of $4.9 million in volunteer hours to their local communities and the state of Washington in 2017. In April 2018, Washington Wing installed the first female to reach the grade of colonel, Shelly J. Norman as wing commander in a change of command ceremony in Wenatchee, Washington.

Other 2018 statistics: - 144 aircrew personnel - 515 cadet orientation flights - 1,537 total hours flown - 779 emergency responders - 15 VHF/FM repeaters - 230 VHF/FM stations - 41 HF stations

== Mission ==
The Washington Wing performs the three missions of the Civil Air Patrol: providing emergency services; offering cadet programs for youth; and providing aerospace education for both CAP members and the general public.

=== Emergency services ===
The Civil Air Patrol provides emergency services, which includes performing search and rescue and disaster relief missions; as well as assisting in humanitarian aid assignments. The CAP also provides Air Force support through conducting light transport, communications support, and low-altitude route surveys. The Civil Air Patrol can also offer support to counter-drug missions.

In March 2021, as a part of Civil Air Patrol's response in combating the COVID-19 pandemic, members of Washington Wing provided support at three vaccine points of distribution.

=== Cadet programs ===
The Civil Air Patrol offers a cadet program for youth aged 12 to 21, which includes aerospace education, leadership training, physical fitness and moral leadership.

=== Aerospace education ===
The Civil Air Patrol offers aerospace education for CAP members and the general public, including providing training to the members of CAP, and offering workshops for youth throughout the nation through schools and public aviation events.

== Squadrons ==
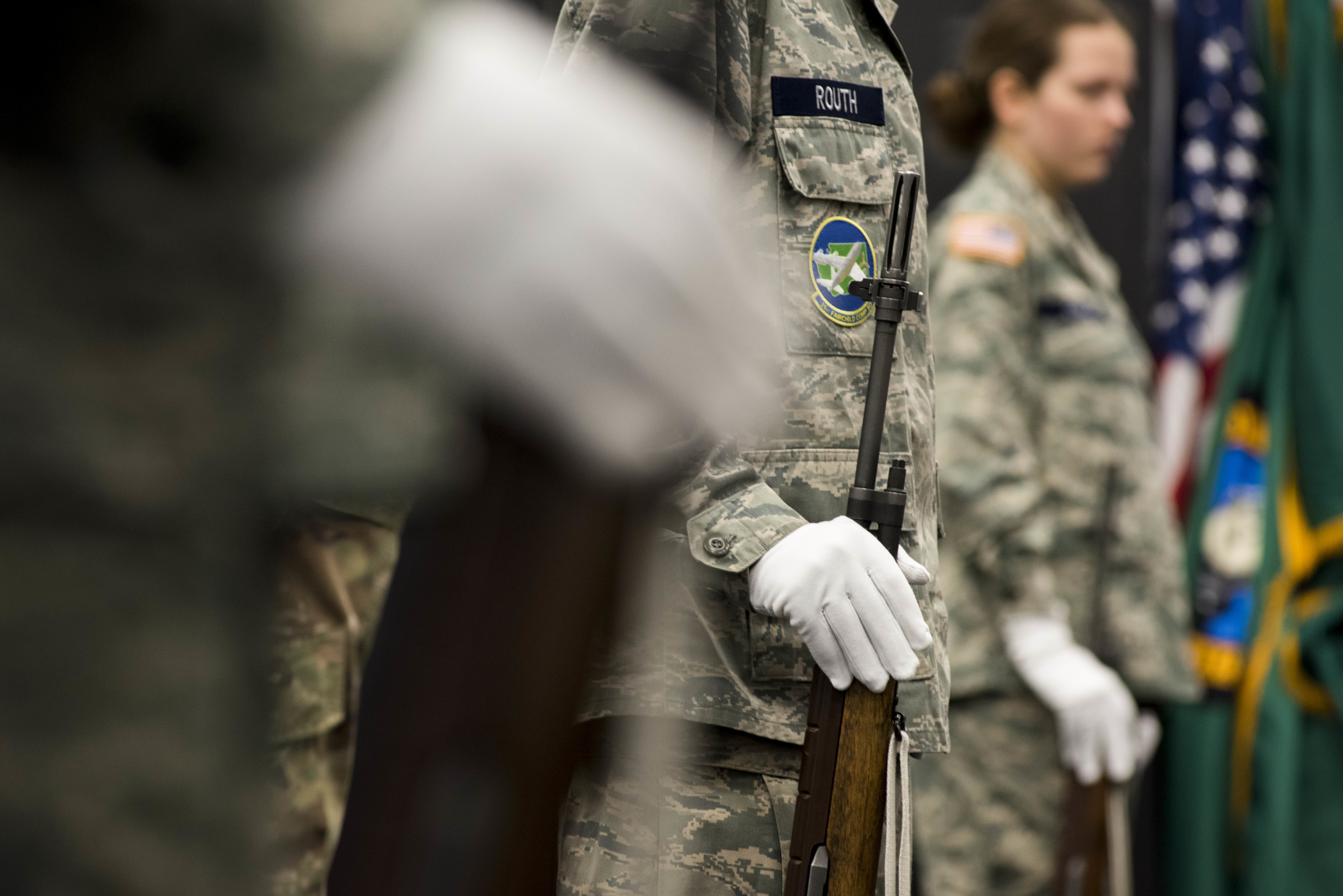
Cadets from the Civil Air Patrol 21st Fairchild Composite Squadron receive instruction on rifle procedures performed by 92nd Air Refueling Wing honor guardsmen.

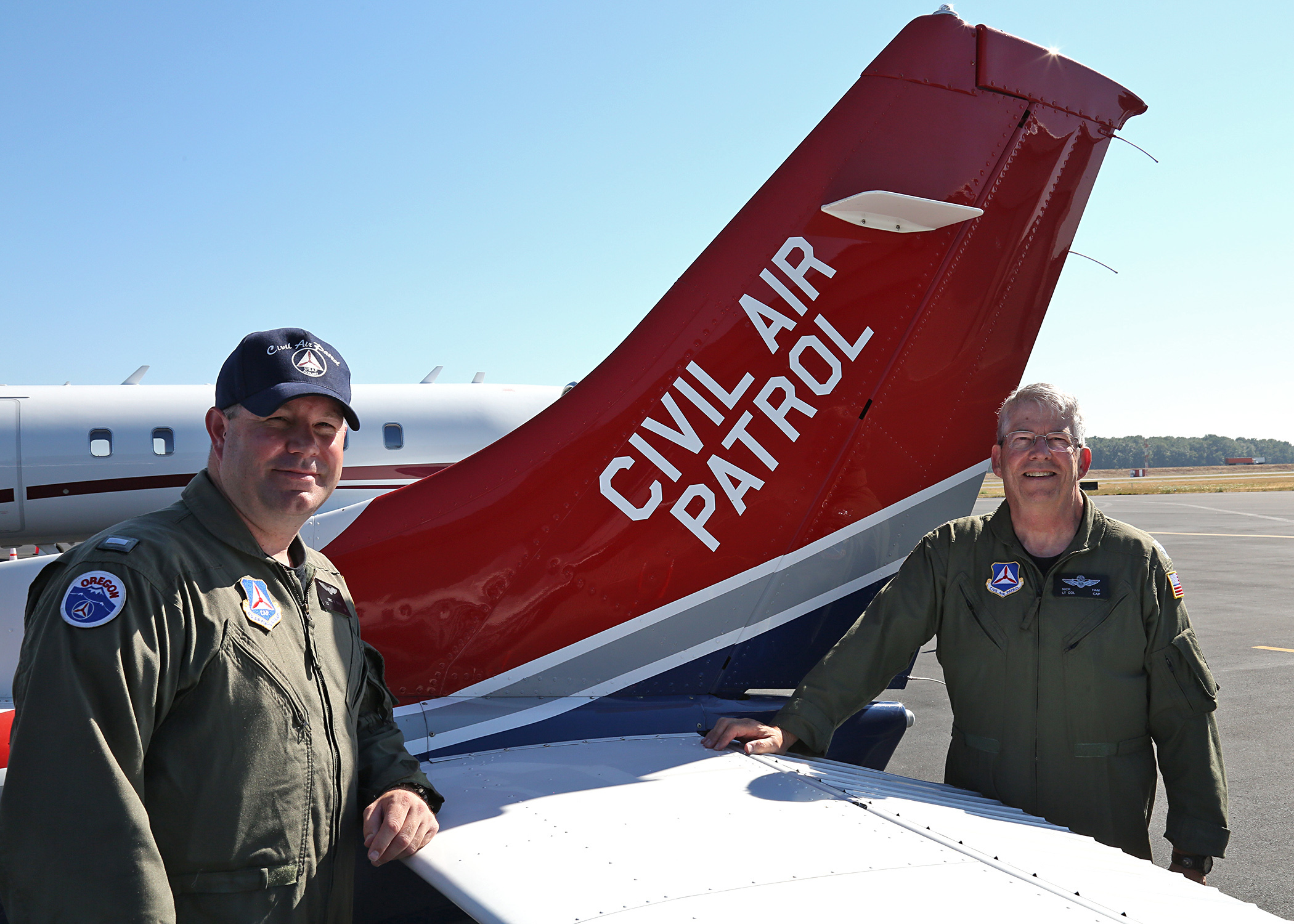
Oregon Civil Air Patrol members pose for a photo with a Cessna 182 Skylane they flew to support a Aerospace Control Alert CrossTell live-fly training exercise.

=== Northwest Group ===
Charter Number	Squadron Name	Location
PCR-WA-093	Arlington Composite Squadron	Arlington, WA
PCR-WA-015	Bellingham Composite Squadron	Bellingham, WA
PCR-WA-091	Dungeness Composite Squadron	Sequim, WA
PCR-WA-068	Northshore Composite Squadron	Bothell, WA
PCR-WA-050	Overlake Composite Squadron	Redmond, WA
PCR-WA-049	Paine Field Composite Squadron	Everett, WA
PCR-WA-051	Peninsula Composite Squadron	Bremerton, WA
PCR-WA-018	Seattle Composite Squadron	Seattle, WA
PCR-WA-046	Skagit Composite Squadron	Burlington, WA

=== Southwest Group ===
Charter Number	Squadron Name	Location
PCR-WA-080	Fort Vancouver Composite Squadron	Vancouver, WA
PCR-WA-002	Green River Composite Squadron	Auburn, WA
PCR-WA-110	Lewis County Composite Squadron	Centralia, WA
PCR-WA-039	McChord Composite Squadron	Joint Base Lewis-McChord
PCR-WA-007	Mount Rainier Composite Squadron	Puyallup, WA
PCR-WA-069	Renton Composite Squadron	Renton, WA
PCR-WA-019	South Sound Composite Squadron	Tumwater, WA

=== Eastern Group ===
Charter Number	Squadron Name	Location
PCR-WA-011	Columbia Basin Composite Squadron	Ephrata, WA
PCR-WA-089	Deer Park Composite Squadron	Deer Park, WA
PCR-WA-021	21st Fairchild Composite Squadron	Fairchild AFB
PCR-WA-092	Inter-State Flight	Pullman, WA
PCR-WA-100	Northern Desert Composite Squadron	Okanogan, WA
PCR-WA-004	Pangborn Composite Squadron	Wenatchee, WA
PCR-WA-003	Spokane Composite Squadron	Spokane Valley, WA
PCR-WA-082	Tri-Cities Composite Squadron	Richland, WA
PCR-WA-005	Twin W Composite Squadron	Walla Walla, WA
PCR-WA-044	Yakima Composite Squadron	Yakima, WA

== Legal protection ==
Under Washington law, it is illegal for an employer within the borders of Washington to discipline or discharge from employment an employee who is a member of the Civil Air Patrol, due to that employee taking a leave of absence in order to take part in an emergency operation as a part of the Civil Air Patrol.

== See also ==
- Washington Air National Guard
- Washington State Guard
