= 194th Wing =

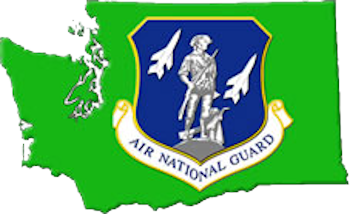
194th Wing

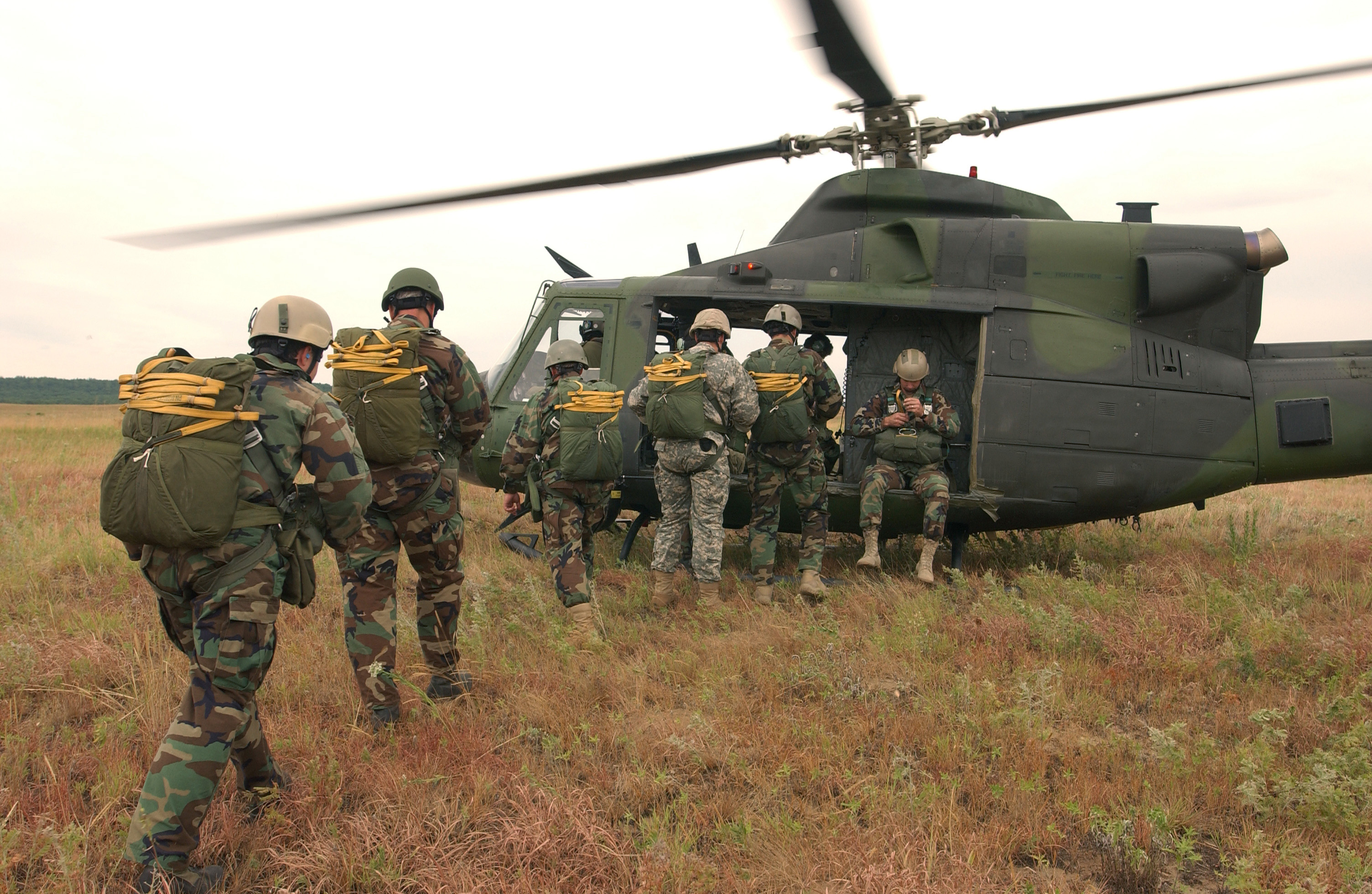
- Members of the wing's 116th Air Support Operations Squadron board a Canadian CH-146 during Griffon Patriot 2006
- Active: 2006–present
- Country: United States
- Allegiance: Washington
- Branch: Air National Guard
- Role: Special Warfare, Cyberspace Operations, and Intelligence
- Part of: Washington Air National Guard
- Garrison/HQ: Camp Murray, Washington
- Decorations: Air Force Outstanding Unit Award

Commanders
- Current commander: Colonel Brian A. Bergren

Insignia
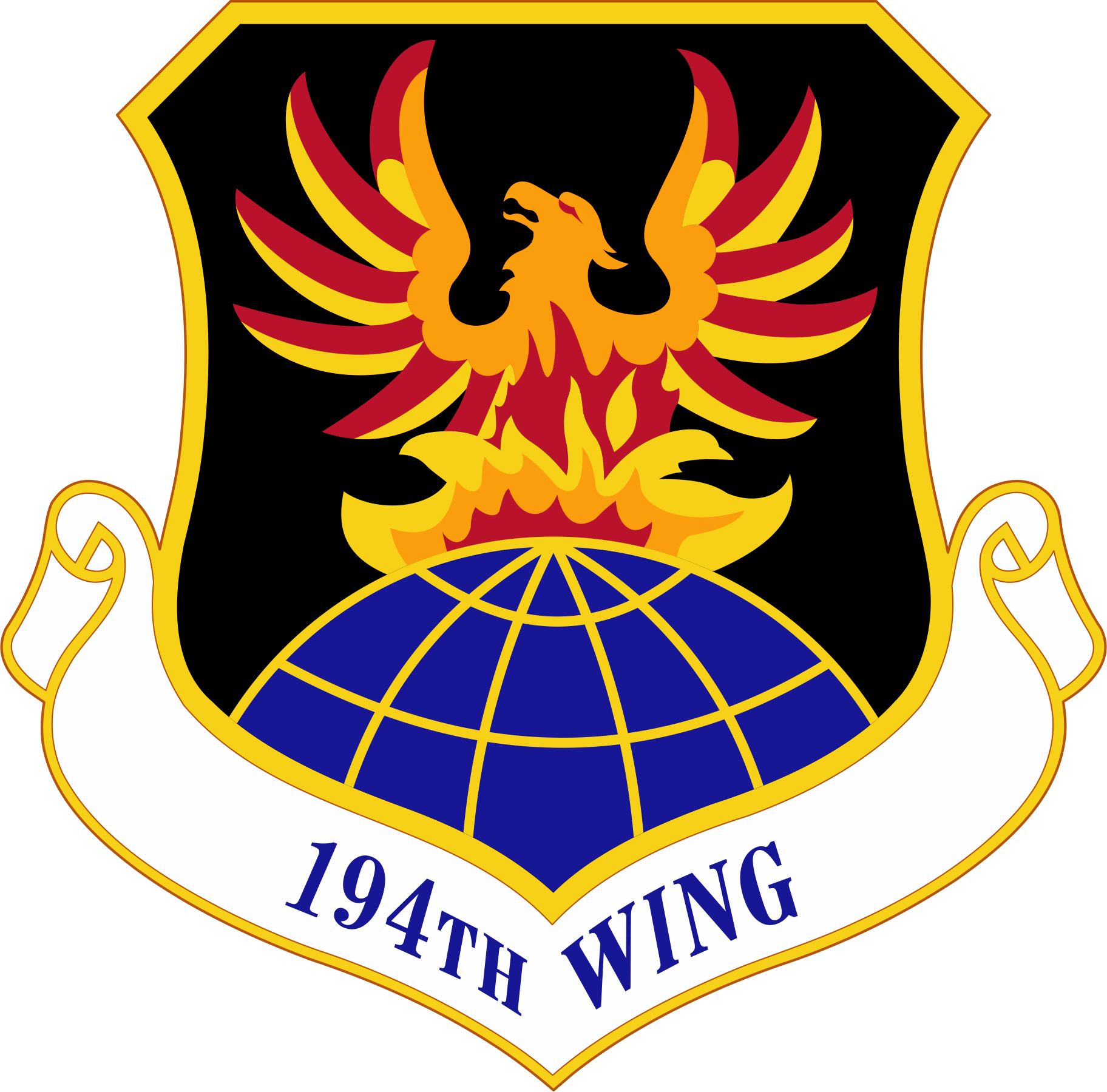
- 194th Wing emblem (Note: Symbolism: Ultramarine blue and Air force yellow are the Air Force colors. Blue alludes to the sky, the primary theater of Air Force operations. Yellow refers to the sun and the excellence required of Air Force personnel. The Phoenix represents the rebirth and change; the constant flexibility needed in an ever-changing Air Force, as well as the diversity of missions within the wing. The Phoenix is rising out of the globe, which represents the unit’s worldwide mission. The Phoenix and globe sit on a field of black, representing cyberspace, the unit’s final theater of operations.)

The United States Air Force's 194th Wing is a special warfare, cyber and intelligence wing headquartered at Camp Murray, Washington. When the 194th Wing was activated on 30 August 2006, it was the Air National Guard's first non-flying Wing.

== Units ==
The 194th Wing is composed of four groups, ten squadrons, and five flights. Most units are stationed at Camp Murray, two are located at Fairchild Air Force Base, and two are located at Joint Base Lewis-McChord.

- 194th Air Support Operations Group
  - 111th Air Support Operations Squadron
  - 116th Air Support Operations Squadron
  - 116th Combat Weather Flight
- The 194th Mission Support Group provides support to the wing through the following organizations:
  - 194th Force Support Squadron
  - 194th Logistics Readiness Squadron
  - 194th Communications Flight
  - 194th Security Forces Squadron
  - 194th Civil Engineering Flight
  - 248th Civil Engineering Flight
- 194th Medical Group provides medical readiness training and other services.
- 252d Cyberspace Operations Group: The 252d Cyberspace Operations Group includes cyberspace and military intelligence personnel.
  - 143d Cyberspace Operations Squadron: The 143d COS operates cyber protection teams.
  - 194th Intelligence Squadron: The 194th IS provides tailored target and geospatial intelligence to the air component and other federated partners to enable precision engagement and effective operations.
  - 242d Combat Communications Squadron: The 242 CBCS rapidly deploys, operates and maintains command, control, communications, and computer systems at any time and location around the globe.
  - 256th Intelligence Squadron: The 256th IS performs digital network intelligence analysis and provides intelligence, surveillance and reconnaissance support for defensive cyber operations.
  - 262d Cyberspace Operations Squadron: The 262d COS operates cyber protection teams.
- The 194th Comptroller Flight is assigned directly to the wing headquarters and provides financial management services to all wing organizations.

== Lineage ==
- Established as the 194th Regional Support Wing and allotted to the Air National Guard

Activated on 30 August 2006
Redesignated 194th Wing c. 8 August 2015

=== Assignments ===
- Washington Air National Guard, 2006–present

Gained by Air Combat Command, 2006-2015
Gained by Air Force Space Command, 2015-2018
Gained by Air Combat Command, 2018-present

=== Components ===
- 194th Air Support Operations Group, 30 August 2006 – present
- 194th Mission Support Group, 30 August 2006 – present
- 194th Medical Group, 30 August 2006 – present
- 252d Cyberspace Operations Group, 30 August 2006 – present

== Commanders ==
- Then-Col. John S. Tuohy, 2006–2008
- Col. Brian T. Dravis, 2008-2013
- Then-Col. Jill Lannan, 2013-2015
- Then-Col. Jeremy Horn, 2015-2017
- Then-Col. Gent Welsh, 2017-2019
- Then-Col. Kenneth Borchers, 2019–2023
- Col. Brian Bergren, 2023-present

=== Awards and campaigns ===
Award streamer	Award	Dates	Notes
	Air Force Outstanding Unit Award	1 November 2005 – 31 October 2007,1 November 2007 – 31 October 2009, 1 November 2009 – 31 October 2011, 1 November 2011 – 31 October 2013	194th Regional Support Wing
	Air Force Outstanding Unit Award	1 November 2013 – 31 October 2015, 1 November 2015 – 31 October 2017	194th Wing
