= Camp Murray =

Washington National Guard base

- Part of Washington National Guard
- Pierce County, near Lakewood, Washington
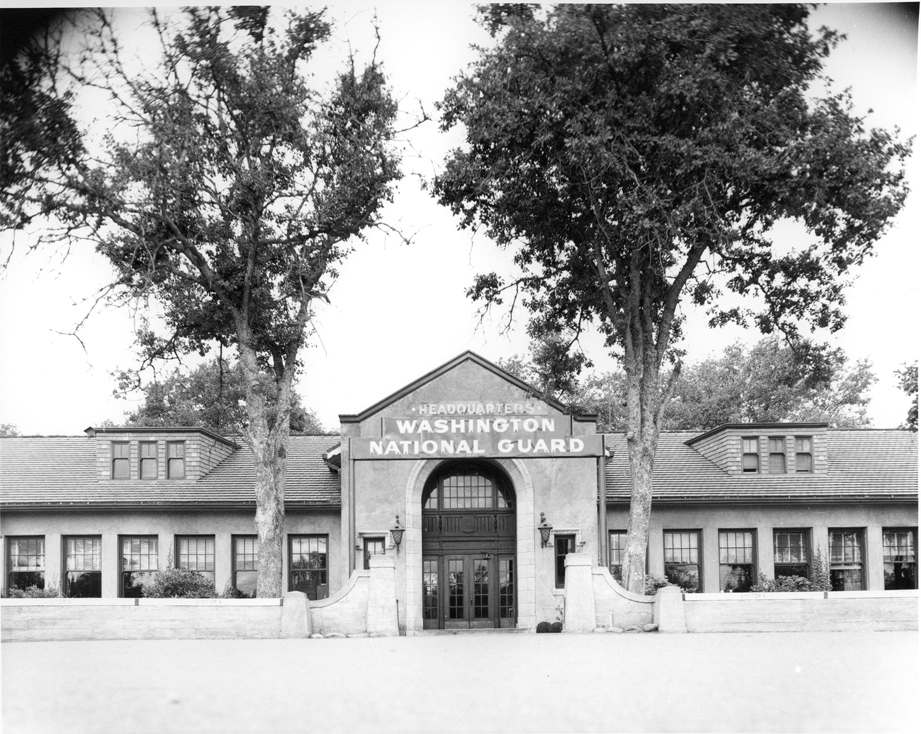
- The Camp Murray Administration Building, built in 1928

Site information
- Type: Camp
- Owner: Washington State
- Controlled by: Washington National Guard
- Open to the public: With permission only

Location
- Coordinates: 47.118°N 122.560°W

Site history
- Built by: Washington National Guard
- In use: 1917-Present

Garrison information
- Current commander: Major General Bret D. Daugherty
- Occupants: Washington National Guard Headquarters; Washington National Guard Museum; 194th Regional Support Wing; Washington State Guard

Camp Murray is a U.S. military installation located southwest of Tacoma, Washington, adjacent to Joint Base Lewis–McChord. It is home to the headquarters of the Washington Army and Air National Guard, Washington State Guard and the Washington Emergency Management Division, all part of the Military Department of the state of Washington.

== History ==
The location of Camp Murray was commissioned as a National Guard base in 1889. Origins from a horse trough from 1890 and a barn from 1920 can still be found there. In 1915, Camp Murray became an official training site named in honor of Isaiah G. Murray. Two years later the Arsenal (Building 2) was the first permanent building constructed.

In 1921, the Washington National Guard Adjutant General residence, also known as "The White House" or building 118, was built adjacent to the Washington National Guard Headquarters Building One. The first resident was Major General W. Thompson and the last to live there was Major General George Haskett in 1965.

In 1928, the Washington Army National Guard (WAARNG) State headquarters (Building 1) was built.

In 2025, there was a fire at the campground which caused the destruction of six travel trailers. The Campground has since been closed for renovations, with its expected reopening to be in 2027.

== See also ==
- Washington National Guard Museum
- Washington Military Department
