= Washington Air National Guard =

- Emblem of the Washington Air National Guard
- Active: 6 August 1924- present
- Country: United States
- Allegiance: Washington
- Branch: Air National Guard
- Type: State militia, military reserve force
- Part of: Washington Military Department; United States National Guard Bureau; National Guard
- Headquarters: Bldg 1, Camp Murray, Tacoma, Washington, 98430

Commanders
- Civilian leadership: President Donald Trump (Commander-in-Chief); Troy Meink (Secretary of the Air Force); Governor Bob Ferguson (Governor of the State of Washington)

Aircraft flown
- Transport: RC-26B Metroliner
- Tanker: KC-135R Stratotanker

The Washington Air National Guard (WA ANG) is the aerial militia of the State of Washington, United States. It is a reserve of the United States Air Force and along with the Washington Army National Guard an element of the Washington National Guard and of the larger United States National Guard Bureau.

As state militia units, the units in the Washington Air National Guard are not in the normal United States Air Force chain of command. They are under the jurisdiction of the governor of Washington through the office of the Washington Adjutant General unless they are federalized by order of the president of the United States. The Washington Air National Guard is headquartered at Camp Murray, Tacoma, and its commander is Brigadier General Gent Welsh.

== Overview ==
Under the "Total Force" concept, Washington Air National Guard units are considered to be Air Reserve Components (ARC) of the United States Air Force (USAF). Washington ANG units are trained and equipped by the Air Force and are operationally gained by a major command of the USAF if federalized. In addition, the Washington Air National Guard forces are assigned to Air Expeditionary Forces and are subject to deployment tasking orders along with their active duty and Air Force Reserve counterparts in their assigned cycle deployment window.

Along with their federal reserve obligations, as state militia units the elements of the Washington ANG are subject to being activated by order of the governor to provide protection of life and property, and preserve peace, order and public safety. State missions include disaster relief in times of earthquakes, hurricanes, floods and forest fires, search and rescue, protection of vital public services, and support to civil defense.

In addition, the Washington State Guard (WSG) is an all-volunteer militia force under the Washington Military Department that provides reserve personnel to both the Washington Army National Guard and the Washington Air National Guard. It is under state jurisdiction and its members are employed only within the State of Washington. It is not subject to be called, ordered or assigned as any element of the federal armed forces. Its mission is to provide units organized, equipped and trained in the protection of life or property and the preservation of peace, order and public safety under competent orders of State authorities.

== Components ==
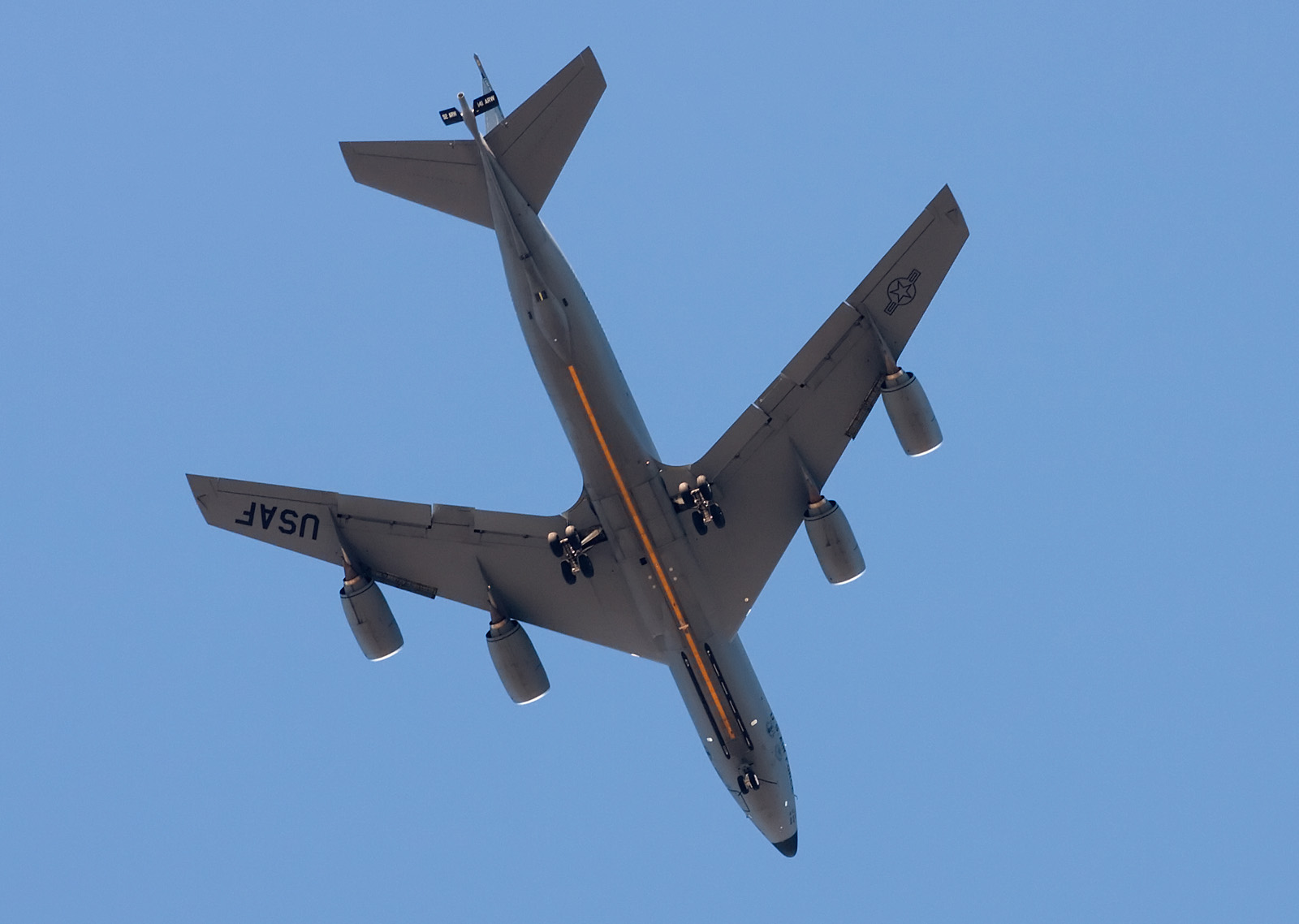
KC-135R Stratotanker of the 116th Air Refueling Squadron in 2009.

The Washington Air National Guard consists of the following major units:

- 141st Air Refueling Wing

Established 6 August 1924 (as: 116th Observation Squadron); operates: KC-135R Stratotanker and RC-26B Metroliner
Stationed at: Fairchild Air Force Base, Spokane
Gained by: Air Mobility Command
The oldest unit of the Washington ANG, the 141st Air Refueling Wing is composed of over 1,000 citizen airmen. Subordinate units within the 141st include: 560th Air National Guard Band, the 242d Combat Communication Squadron, and the 256th Intelligence Squadron.

- 194th Wing

Established 30 August 2006; non-flying Wing
Stationed at: Camp Murray, Lakewood
Gained by: Air Combat Command
The 194th Wing consists of nearly 1,000 citizen airmen in the fields of cyberspace operations, air support operations, mission support, and medical. The 194th's cutting edge capabilities are well-suited to the threats the world faces in the 21st Century.

- Western Air Defense Sector

Established 8 January 1958 (as: Seattle Air Defense Sector), non-flying unit
Stationed at: Joint Base Lewis-McChord, Tacoma
Gained by: Air Combat Command
The unit's origins date to 1948 as the 25th Air Division; the first Air Defense Command Air Division formed for the air defense of the United States. Today, the Washington ANG Western Air Defense Sector (WADS) is one of two sectors responsible to NORAD's aerospace warning and control mission. The Western Air Defense Sector is part of the Continental U.S. NORAD region which includes both Canadian and Alaskan NORAD regions.

== History ==
The Washington Air National Guard origins date to 28 August 1917 with the establishment of the 116th Aero Squadron as part of the World War I American Expeditionary Force. The 116th served in France on the Western Front, then after the 1918 Armistice with Germany was demobilized in 1919.

The Militia Act of 1903 established the present National Guard system, units raised by the states but paid for by the Federal Government, liable for immediate state service. If federalized by Presidential order, they fall under the regular military chain of command. On 1 June 1920, the Militia Bureau issued Circular No.1 on organization of National Guard air units.

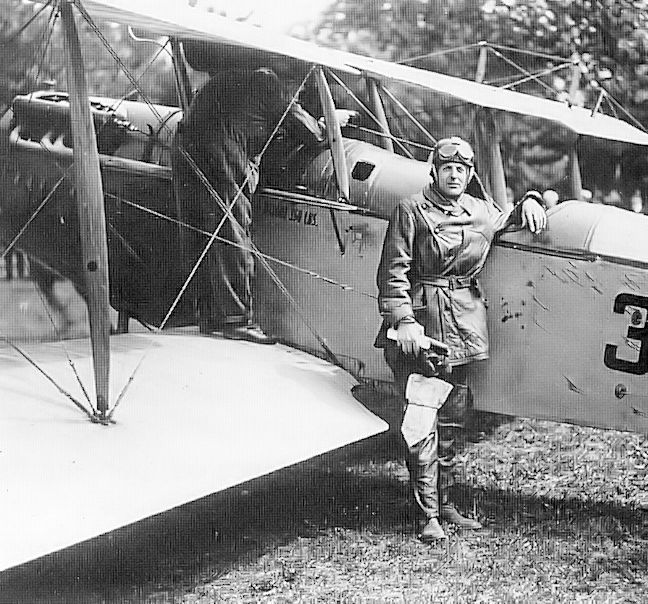
Reuben Fleet of the Washington Air National Guard, with a Curtiss JN-6 Jenny in 1925. Previously, he established the United States Air Mail Service in May 1918.

In 1924, the Adjutant General for the Washington National Guard, who was traveling through Spokane, made a simple proposal to the city fathers. Whichever city, Spokane, Seattle or Tacoma, could raise 10,000 dollars first for building hangars would get an Observation Squadron. As the General's westward train pulled out of the station and was approaching the city limits, a telegraph wire sent out ahead of the train stated, "The $10,000 has been raised. We want the squadron."

On 6 August 1924 the 116th Observation Squadron, Washington National Guard, received federal recognition. They established their unit headquarters at the former Parkwater Municipal Golf Course (now Felts Field) near Spokane. Major John T. "Jack" Fancher, a World War I veteran, would act as the units' first commander. It is one of the 29 original National Guard Observation Squadrons of the United States Army National Guard formed before World War II. The 116th Observation Squadron was ordered into active service on 16 September 1940 as part of the buildup of the Army Air Corps prior to the United States entry into World War II.

On 24 May 1946, the United States Army Air Forces, in response to dramatic postwar military budget cuts, imposed by President Harry S. Truman, allocated inactive unit designations to the National Guard Bureau for the formation of an Air Force National Guard. These unit designations were allotted and transferred to various State National Guard bureaus to provide them unit designations to re-establish them as Air National Guard units.

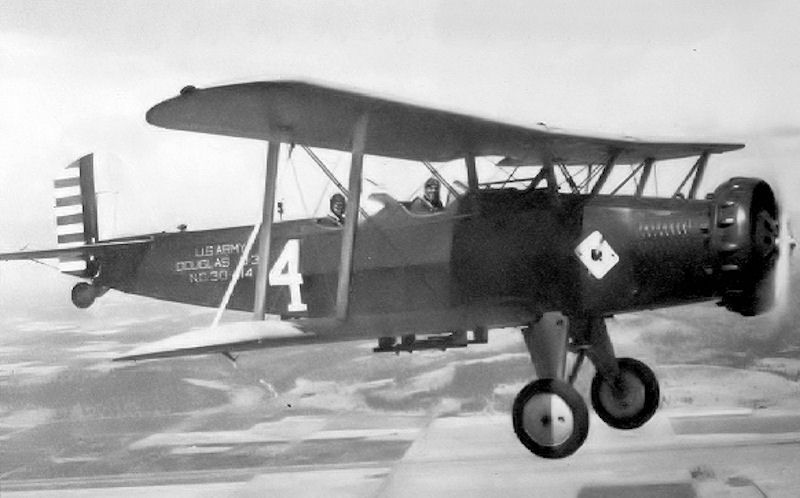
A Douglas O-38 of the 116th Observation Squadron. The 116th operated this type of aircraft between 1931 and 1940. Note the squadron emblem on the fuselage.

The modern Washington ANG received federal recognition on 1 July 1946 as the 116th Fighter Squadron at Felts Field, Spokane. It was equipped with F-51D Mustangs and its mission was the air defense of the state. 18 September 1947, however, is considered the Washington Air National Guard's official birth concurrent with the establishment of the United States Air Force as a separate branch of the United States military under the National Security Act The 143rd Air Control and Warning Squadron was formed in 1948 and was later redesignated as a combat communications squadron, operating out of Boeing Field in Seattle for its first 60 years. Additional combat communications units were added throughout the Cold War years under the umbrella of the 252nd Combat Communications Group, which was federally recognized in 1953. On 1 May 1956 the 116th Fighter-Interceptor Squadron was authorized to expand to a group level, and the 141st Fighter Group (Air Defense) was allotted by the National Guard Bureau, extended federal recognition and activated. The Washington Air National Guard took on a support operations mission with the formation of the 111th Air Support Operations Squadron at Camp Murray in 1988.

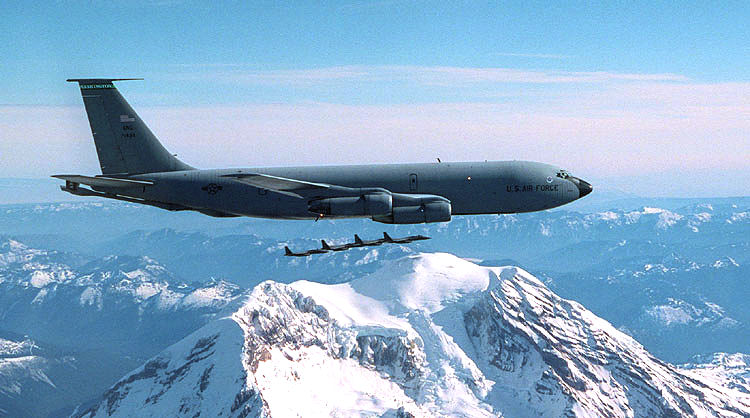
A KC-135 of the 116th Air Refueling Squadron over Mount Rainier. The 116th is the oldest unit in the Washington Air National Guard.

Today, the 141st ARW provides aerial refueling support to Air Force, Navy and Marine Corps and allied nation aircraft. The 194th WG, formed in 2006 to bring together various units throughout the state, includes mission specializations in cyberspace operations and air support operations; at the time of its formation, the 194th was the only non-flying Wing in the Air National Guard. WADS is one of two sectors responsible to NORAD's aerospace warning and control mission.

After the September 11th, 2001 terrorist attacks on the United States, elements of every Air National Guard unit in Washington has been activated in support of the global war on terrorism. Flight crews, aircraft maintenance personnel, communications technicians, air controllers and air security personnel were engaged in Operation Noble Eagle air defense overflights of major United States cities. Also, Washington ANG units have been deployed overseas as part of Operation Enduring Freedom in Afghanistan and Operation Iraqi Freedom in Iraq as well as other locations as directed.

== See also ==
- Washington Wing Civil Air Patrol
