= 141st Operations Group =

141st Air Refueling Wing
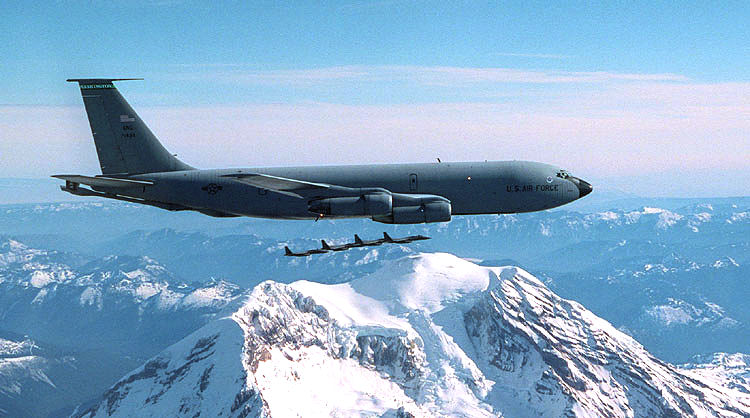
- 141st Air Refueling Group KC-135 Stratotanker over Mount Rainier
- Active: 1960-1976, 1993–present
- Country: United States
- Allegiance: Washington
- Branch: Air National Guard
- Role: Air refueling
- Part of: Washington Air National Guard
- Garrison/HQ: Fairchild Air Force Base, Washington.
- Website: https://www.141arw.ang.af.mil

Insignia
- 141st Air Refueling Group emblem (Note: While assigned to the 141st Wing, the group uses the wing emblem with the group designation on the scroll. AF Instruction 84-105, Organizational Lineage, Honors and History, 27 April 2017, paragraph 3.3.3.)

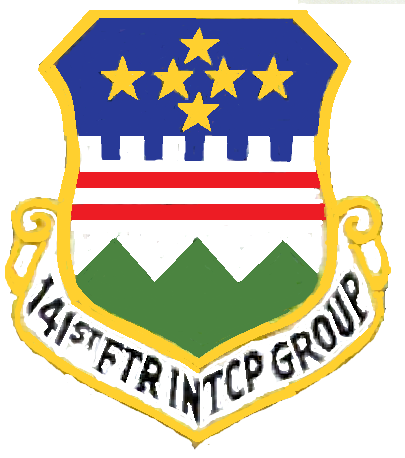
- 141 Fighter-Interceptor Group emblem

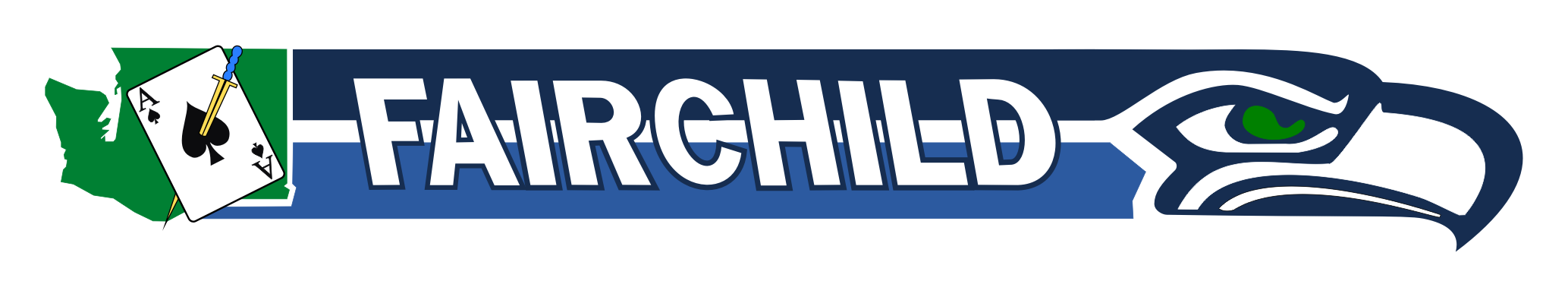
- Tail stripe

The 141st Operations Group is a unit of the Washington Air National Guard, stationed at Fairchild Air Force Base, Washington. If activated to federal service, the group is gained by Air Mobility Command (AMC). As a result of Base Realignment and Closure action, the group no longer has aircraft assigned and is an associate squadron sharing KC-135R aircraft with AMC's 92d Air Refueling Wing at Fairchild.

The group was first organized at Geiger Field, Washington in 1960 as the 141st Fighter Group. It trained for air defense until 1976, when it was replaced by the 141st Air Refueling Wing, while its operational and support elements moved to Fairchild. It was redesignated the 141st Operations Group and reactivated when the 141st Wing reorganized under the Objective Wing reorganization. The group's 116th Air Refueling Squadron was first organized during World War I as the 116th Aero Squadron, and is one of the 29 squadrons of the United States Army National Guard formed before World War II.

== Mission ==
The group's mission is to provide air refueling capability for the United States Air Force and its associated reserve elements. It also provides air refueling support to Navy, Marine Corps and allied nation aircraft. Equipped with the Boeing KC-135 Stratotanker, the group is capable of transporting litter and ambulatory patients using patient support pallets during aeromedical evacuation. The KC-135 has often served as transport for 141st Wing units.

== History ==
=== Air defense ===
In June 1960 the Washington Air National Guard's 116th Fighter-Interceptor Squadron was authorized to expand to a group level, and the 141st Fighter Group (Air Defense) was extended federal recognition and activated on 1 July 1960. The 116th became new group's flying squadron. Other units assigned into the group included the 141st Material Squadron, 141st Air Base Squadron, and the 141st USAF Dispensary. The group was assigned to the 142d Air Defense Wing. It was equipped with the Northrop F-89J Scorpion jet interceptor, armed with nuclear AIR-2 Genie rockets.

Two 141st fighters crashed during the winter of 1961/62. On 28 December 1961, an F-89 Scorpion lost power and crashed approach to Geiger Field. Both pilots were killed. A second crash occurred a week later when, an F-89 crashed northeast of Penticton, British Columbia. One crewmember ejected and was rescued by a Royal Canadian Air Force helicopter crew. A third crash occurred on 17 November 1963, when mechanical failure caused an F-89 to crash during a night training mission near Windy Peak in Okanogan County, Washington. The observer was rescued near the crash site, but the body of the pilot wasn't recovered until 1974.

In 1965, the 116th converted from the F-89 to the Convair F-102 Delta Dagger. 1967 was a "trophy year" for the group. Trophies and awards received included the Spaatz Trophy for the most outstanding Air National Guard flying unit, the Air National Guard Outstanding Unit Plaque, the Air Force Outstanding Unit Trophy and the Winston P. Wilson Award. Through 1969, the unit accumulated 37,900 accident-free flying hours, receiving the 25th Air Division Flying Safety Award five years in a row.

In 1969, the group converted to the McDonnell F-101 Voodoo, which it flew until 30 June 1976, when the group was inactivated. The 116th Fighter-Interceptor Squadron and most of the group's support units moved to Fairchild Air Force Base, where they became part of the new 141st Air Refueling Wing.

The group was redesignated the 141st Operations Group and activated at Fairchild, when the 141st Wing reorganized under the Combat Wing system of organization. On 13 January 1999, one of the unit's Boeing KC-135E Stratotankers crashed at NATO Air Base Geilenkirchen, Germany, killing all four crew members. This was the first time the unit lost an aircraft or lives since beginning the air refueling. A monument was erected at the site the following year.

=== Global War on Terrorism ===
After the 11 September 2001 attacks, the group began refueling flights supporting Operation Noble Eagle almost immediately. In 2002 a new digital navigation system, called Pacer Crag, was added to the aircraft and crews trained to function without a navigator. Members of the group also joined the thousands of Guard and reserve forces called up to deploy all over the world in support of America's War on Terror.

At the time President George W. Bush ordered coalition military units into Iraq during Operation Iraqi Freedom in March 2003, the group training to transition the KC-135R. Since then the group has supported continuous deployments including antiterrorism efforts abroad under Operation Enduring Freedom and air refueling missions over the US for homeland defense flights under Operation Noble Eagle. Overseas deployments and homeland security refueling missions have dominated the tasking landscape for the group since 2004. In response to the 2005 Base Realignment and Closure process, the last of the KC-135 Stratotankers belonging to the 141st were transferred to Iowa, and as of 1 October 2007 group crew members now share aircraft with the active duty 92d Air Refueling Wing.

== Lineage ==
- Constituted as the 141st Fighter Group (Air Defense) and allotted to the Air National Guard on 24 June 1960

Extended federal recognition and activated on 1 July 1960
Redesignated 141st Fighter-interceptor Group c. 1 January 1972
Inactivated on 30 June 1976
Redesignated 141st Operations Group
Activated on 1 January 1993

=== Assignments ===
- 142d Air Defense Wing (later 142d Fighter-Interceptor Wing), 1 July 1960 – 30 June 1976
- 141st Air Refueling Wing, 1 January 1993 – present

=== Components ===
Squadrons

- 116th Fighter-Interceptor Squadron (later 116th Air Refueling Squadrons) 1 July 1960 – 30 June 1976, 1 January 1993 – present
- 141st Air Base Squadron (later 141st Combat Support Squadron), 1 July 1960 – 30 June 1976
- 141st Consolidated Aircraft Maintenance Squadron, 1 Jul 60 – 30 June 1976
- 141st Materiel Squadron, 1 July 60 – 30 June 1976
- 141st Operations Support Squadron, 1 January 1993 – present
- 141st Supply Squadron, 20 May 64 – 30 June 1976

Other

- 141st USAF Dispensary (later 141st USAF Clinic), 1 July 1960 – 30 June 1976
- 116th Weather Flight, 29 August 1961 – 30 June 76
- 141st Civil Engineering Flight, 1 November 1969 – 30 June 76

=== Stations ===
- Geiger Field, Washington, 1 July 1960 – 1 July 1976
- Fairchild Air Force Base, Washington, 1 January 1993 – present

=== Aircraft ===
- Northrop F-89J Scorpion, 1960–1965
- Convair F-102A Delta Dagger, 1966–1969
- McDonnell F-101B Voodoo, 1969–1976
- Boeing KC-135E Stratotanker, 1993–2006
- RC-26B Metroliner, 2004–present
- Boeing KC-135R Stratotanker, 2006–present

== See also ==
- F-89 Scorpion units of the United States Air Force
