= General Fairchild =

General Fairchild may refer to:

- Lucius Fairchild (1831–1896), Union Army brigadier general
- Muir S. Fairchild (1894–1950), U.S. Air Force general

== See also ==
- Attorney General Fairchild (disambiguation)
