= Air Force Historical Research Agency =

Archival agency

Department of the Air Force Historical Research Agency
- Motto: "Preserving the Past. Informing the Present and Future."
- Mission: The Air Force Historical Research Agency (AFHRA) preserves Department of the Air Force (DAF) history and provides information and analyses to support official customers and the general public in a variety of venues and formats. The AFHRA administers the lineage, heritage, and emblems of DAF organizations; advises manpower and organization offices at Headquarters, United States Air Force ( HQ USAF), HQ, United States Space Force (USSF), Major Commands, Direct Reporting Units, and Field Operating Agencies on the selection of units and establishments to be activated and other organizational matters; supports contingency operations; prepares reference works; conducts an oral history program; operates an information system to index and retrieve historical data; and provides field support to Air Force History and Museums Program personnel. The AFHRA will provide the same level of support to both the USAF and the USSF.
- Address: 600 Chennault Circle Maxwell AFB, AL 36112
- Website: www.dafhistory.af.mil

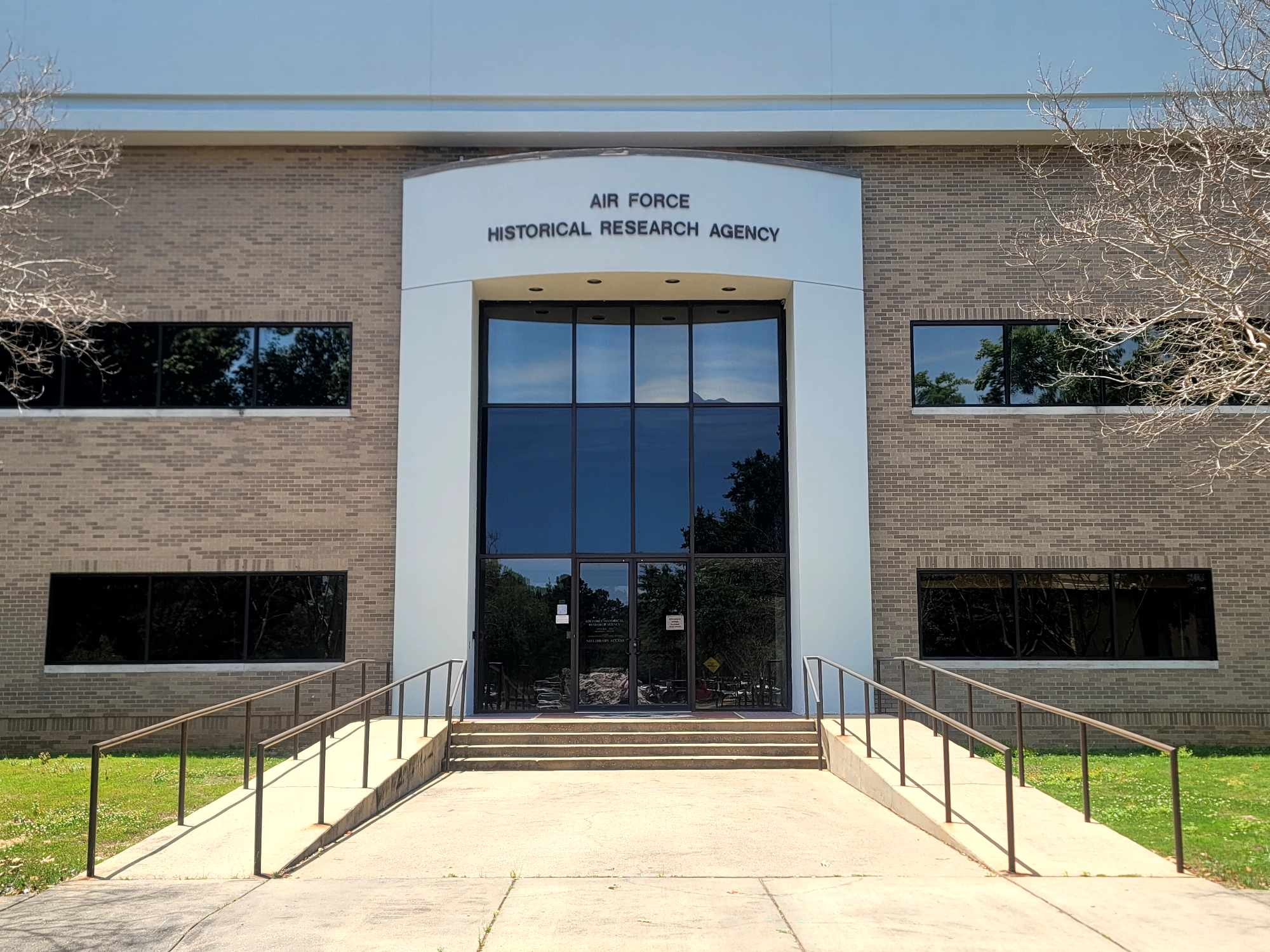
Entrance to the Air Force Historical Research Agency (U.S. Air Force Photo by Mr. Nicholas Rich)

The Air Force Historical Research Agency (AFHRA) the Department of the Air Force's central repository for physical and digital documentation. The archivists and historians who work at AFHRA collect, manage, and preserve the archival collections of the United States Air Force (USAF) and United States Space Force (USSF). The agency's collection began during World War II in Washington, D.C., and moved in 1949 to Maxwell Air Force Base, the site of Air University, to provide research facilities for professional military education students, the faculty, visiting scholars, and the general public.

The U.S Air Force History Office in Bolling Air Force Base Building 5681 in Washington, D.C., houses microfilm copies of archival materials in the United States Air Force Historical Research Center at Maxwell Air Force Base.

Published guides of the collection include the Air Force Historical Archives Document Classification Guide (1971), Personal Papers in the USAF Historical Research Center compiled by Richard E. Morse and Thomas C. Lobenstein (1980), U.S. Air Force Oral History Catalog (1982), and the United States Air Force History: A Guide to Documentary Sources.

== Holdings ==
Holdings include published and unpublished reports and oral histories on topics including:

- Col. Bernt Balchen correspondence, memos, and articles on polar regions
- BRIG. GEN. William N. Best Air Force oral history program interview No. 717.
- GEOPHYSICS IN CONNECTION WITH THE "INTERNATIONAL YEAR OF THE QUIET SUN" 1964-65
- GERMAN METEOROLOGICAL SERVICE, WORLD WAR II report on its organization, duties, and responsibilities to the Luftwaffe. 1944.
- 400TH AEROSPACE APPLICATIONS GROUP. History, 1963–1973.
- AIR WEATHER SERVICE history, 1945–46.
- AIR WEATHER SERVICE history, 1966–67.
- ARMY AIR FORCES TRAINING COMMAND history of the weather training program, 1939–1945.
- CLIMATE AND WEATHER MODIFICATION Air Force History Narrative.
- EASTERN TECHNICAL TRAINING COMMAND contract meteorology schools report on the experiment ato train Air Force Weather Officers, 1944
- FIFTH AIR FORCE, history of participation in Project Grayback (Fulton surface-to-air recovery system) 1955
- METEOROLOGICAL SATELLITE PROGRAM, STUDY OF METEOROLOGY AFFECTING ALMOST EVERY PHASE OF AIR FORCE OPERATIONS, 1961.
- THIRTEENTH AIR FORCE, history of participation in Project 119-L, which provided for a worldwide meteorological survey between 1 November 1955 and 1 April 1956
- GEN Curtis Lemay correspondence on meteorology.
- METEOROLOGICAL CONDITIONS DURING MILITARY OPERATIONS. Since 1942.
- METEOROLOGICAL EQUIPMENT FOR POLAR ICE PACK STATION.
- METEOROLOGICAL SOUNDING SYSTEM, AF Global Weather Central.
- METEOROLOGICAL SURVEY, an aerial photography of Western Europe, etc. 1945.
- METEOROLOGISTS TO THE BALLOON CORPS, National Association of American Balloon Corps Veterans.

== See also ==
- History of the United States Air Force
- Fairchild Memorial Hall
- Air Force History and Museums Program
