= Fairchild Memorial Hall =

Coordinates: 32°23′7.01″N 86°20′42.26″W

Fairchild Memorial Hall houses the Air University (AU) library at Maxwell Air Force Base, Alabama.

The premier library in the United States Department of Defense, the AU Library holds especially strong collections in the fields of warfare, aeronautics, United States Air Force and DOD operations, military sciences, international relations, military education, leadership and management.

Named for General Muir S. Fairchild, the founder and first commander of Air University, the library serves as the focal point of faculty and student research, holding more than 2.9 million items.

== History ==
In April 1946 the newly formed Air University Library (AUL) was located at building 37, preparing for the AU's opening in September, as part of what was expected to be “the most progressive and forward looking system of military education in the entire world.”

The AUL was organizationally structured as its predecessor, the Army Air Force School of Applied Tactics Library, at Orlando, Florida. The organizational structure consisted of five divisions and six branches located at Maxwell and the now-defunct Craig Air Force Base, in Alabama, and at the School of Aviation Medicine at Randolph Field in Texas. By 1951 the AUL had expanded to six divisions in order to accommodate and service its branches.

In August 1949, Headquarters United States Air Force changed the designation of the AUL to the “Department of the Air Force Library.” The following month, the Air Historical Group (later to become the Air Force Historical Research Agency moved from Washington, D.C. to Maxwell Air Force Base. After several administrative changes had occurred due to the merger the Library once again became the “Air University Library” in March 1950.

On January 17, 1951, Building 37 was designated “Fairchild Memorial Hall” and a commemorative plaque was installed to honor Fairchild, Air University’s first commander, who had since been promoted to the rank of General and was at the time of his death (March 17, 1950) the vice-Chief of Staff of the United States Air Force.

By the end of the 1940s the problems of scattered and decentralized collections were becoming apparent. A request for a newer building was submitted in 1950 and summarily disapproved. Later the Air University Board of Visitors championed the cause of a newer and centralized facility, and on April 28, 1955 a formal groundbreaking ceremony was held in what was to become the center of the Air University Academic Circle (Chennault Circle). The new Fairchild Memorial Hall (Building 1405) was formally dedicated on October 18, 1956.

The credo of the Air Corps Tactical School is expressed in its motto Proficimus More Irretenti - 'We Make Progress Unhindered by Custom'.
