= Attorney General Fairchild =

Attorney General Fairchild may refer to:

- Charles S. Fairchild (1842–1924), Attorney General of New York
- Thomas E. Fairchild (1912–2007), Attorney General of Wisconsin

== See also ==
- General Fairchild (disambiguation)
