= 141st Air Refueling Wing =

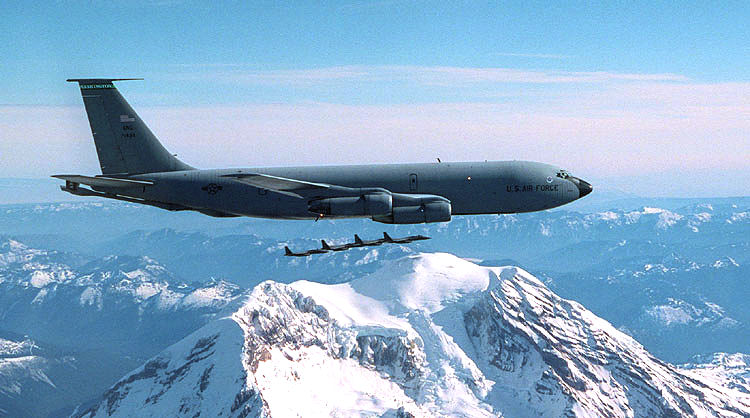
- 141st Air Refueling Wing KC-135 Stratotanker over Mount Rainier
- Active: 1976–present
- Country: United States
- Allegiance: Washington
- Branch: Air National Guard
- Type: Wing
- Role: Aerial refueling
- Part of: Washington Air National Guard
- Garrison/HQ: Fairchild Air Force Base, Spokane, Washington.
- Tail Code: Fairchild
- Website: http://www.141arw.ang.af.mil

Commanders
- Wing Commander: Colonel James McGovern
- Command Chief Master Sergeant: Chief Master Sgt. Ed Pohl

Insignia
- 141st Air Refueling Wing emblem

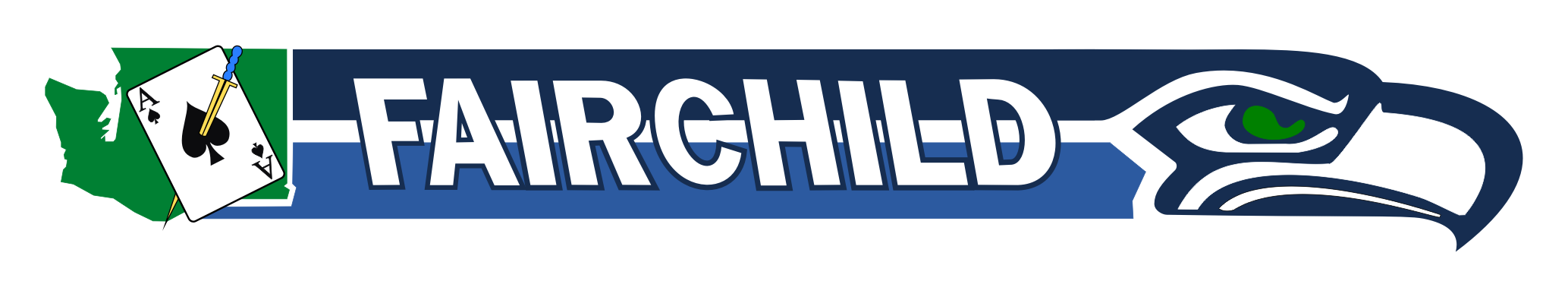
- Tail stripe

The 141st Air Refueling Wing is a unit of the Washington Air National Guard, stationed at Fairchild Air Force Base, Spokane, Washington. If activated to federal service, the wing is gained by Air Mobility Command (AMC). As a result of Base Realignment and Closure action, the wing no longer has any unit assigned aircraft and is an associate squadron sharing KC-135R aircraft with AMC's 92d Air Refueling Wing at Fairchild. The wing was activated in 1976, when it absorbed the subordinate elements of the 141st Fighter-Interceptor Group, which moved to Fairchild from Geiger Field, where they had been supporting an air defense mission.

The 116th Air Refueling Squadron assigned to the wing's 141st Operations Group, was first organized during World War I as the 116th Aero Squadron, and is one of the 29 squadrons of the United States Army National Guard formed before World War II.

== Mission ==
The wing's mission is to provide the air refueling for the United States Air Force and the Air Guard. It also provides air refueling support to Navy, Marine Corps and allied nation aircraft. Equipped with the Boeing KC-135 Stratotanker, the wing is capable of transporting litter and ambulatory patients using patient support pallets during aeromedical evacuations. The KC-135 has often served as transport for the wing's own units.

== Units ==
The 141st Air Refueling Wing is composed of the following units:

- 141st Operations Group

116th Air Refueling Squadron

- 141st Maintenance Group
- 141st Mission Support Group
- 141st Medical Group

The wing provides support to two squadrons that are assigned to the 194th Regional Support Wing but are geographically separated units stationed at Fairchild AFB:

- 242d Combat Communications Squadron
- 256th Intelligence Squadron

== History ==
=== Organization and initial operations ===
In July 1976, the wing was organized at Fairchild Air Force Base, receiving most of its units, including the 116th Air Refueling Squadron. from the 141st Fighter-Interceptor Group, which was inactivated at Geiger Field. was transferred to Strategic Air Command (SAC) and the 116th Fighter Squadron converted to the KC-135 Stratotanker, becoming the fifth Air National Guard unit to join SAC. With the transfer, the 141st was changed in status from a Group to a Wing. The 141st Air Refueling Wing also moved from Geiger Field to nearby Fairchild Air Force Base to accommodate the larger KC-135A aircraft. An Air National Guard spokesman at the time characterized the conversion from the F-101 Voodoo to the KC-135 as "like giving up an MG for a semi-truck".

During the 1990 Gulf Crisis, aircrew, maintenance and support personnel responded to the Iraq invasion of Kuwait on 2 August 1990, and deployed to Jeddah, Saudi Arabia. Upon federal activation in December 1990, all eight of the unit’s KC-135's deployed to the Middle East. The 116th refueled coalition attack aircraft during Operation Desert Storm.

In December 1991, the unit responded with aircrew and support personnel for Operation Restore Hope, a United Nations relief mission to aid hunger victims in Somalia. In 1992, the Air Force considered, but ultimately rejected, converting the 141st from an air refueling wing to a bomb wing equipped with the Boeing B-52 Stratofortress, possibly transferred from the 92nd Bomb Wing. June 1995, several rotations deployed to Pisa, Italy, for Operation Deny Flight, NATO mission enforcing the no-fly zone over Bosnia-Herzegovina. In May 1999, six KC-135E's deployed to Budapest, Hungary in support of Operation Allied Force to deter ethnic aggressions in Yugoslavia.

On 13 January 1999, one of the unit's KC-135Es crashed at NATO Air Base Geilenkirchen Air Base, Germany, killing all four crew members. This was the first time the wing lost an aircraft or lives. A monument was erected at the site the following year.

=== Global War on Terrorism ===
After the 11 September 2001 attacks, the 141st ARW began refueling flights supporting Operation Noble Eagle almost immediately. In 2002 a new digital navigation system, called Pacer CRAG, was added to the aircraft and crews trained to function without a navigator. Members of the 116th also joined the thousands of Guard and Reserve forces called up to deploy all over the world in support of America's "War on Terror."

When the first Guard KC-135 R-model landed on Fairchild AFB in January 2003, with its new engines, it became the 40th different airplane the 116th pilots had flown since it was created back in 1924. Each one of the four engines of the KC-135R produces over 21,000 pounds of thrust. The unit's first plane, the JN-6-A2 "Jenny," had a wooden body covered in fabric and only weighed 1,430 pounds.

At the time President George W. Bush ordered coalition military units into Iraq during Operation Iraqi Freedom in March 2003, the 116th was in a training status to transition into the R model KC-135. Since then the 116th has supported continuous deployments including antiterrorism efforts abroad under Operation Enduring Freedom and air refueling missions over the US for homeland defense flights under Operation Noble Eagle.

During a banquet ceremony in July 2003, the 141st Air Refueling Wing accepted the coveted Solano Trophy marking the wing as the best Air National Guard unit in the 15th Air Force.

Overseas deployments and homeland security refueling missions have dominated the tasking landscape for the squadron since 2004. In response to the Congress-mandated 2005 Base Realignment and Closure process, the last of the KC-135R Stratotankers belonging to the 141st Air Refueling Wing were redirected to the 185th Air Refueling Wing of the Iowa Air National Guard to replace their high maintenance KC-135Es. On 1 October 2007 the wing shares aircraft with the active duty 92d Air Refueling Wing.

== Lineage ==
- Constituted as the 141st Air Refueling Wing, Heavy and allotted to the Air National Guard on 21 June 1976

Extended federal recognition and activated on 1 July 1976
Redesignated 141st Air Refueling Wing on 16 March 1992

=== Assignments ===
- Washington Air National Guard, 1 July 1976 – present

=== Gaining command on mobilization ===
Strategic Air Command, 1 July 1976
Air Combat Command, 1 June 1992
Air Mobility Command, 1 June 1993 – present

=== Components ===
Groups

- 141st Combat Support Group (later 141st Combat Support Squadron, 141st Combat Support Group, 141st Support Group, 141st Mission Support Group), 1 July 1976 – present
- 141st Logistics Group (later 141st Maintenance Group), 1 January 1993 – present
- 141st Medical Group, see 141st USAF Clinic
- 141st Operations Group, 1 January 1993 – present

Squadrons

- 116th Fighter-Interceptor Squadron (later 116th Air Refueling Squadron), 1 July 1976 – 1 January 1993
- 141st Civil Engineering Squadron, see 141st Civil Engineering Flight
- 141st Combat Support Squadron, see 141st Combat Support Group
- 141st Consolidated Aircraft Maintenance Squadron, 1 July 1976 – 1 January 1993
- 141st Medical Squadron, see 141st USAF Clinic

Flights

- 141st Civil Engineering Flight (later 141st Civil Engineering Squadron), 1 July 1976 – 1 January 1993
- 141st Communications Flight (later 141st Information Systems Flight, 141st Communications Flight), 1 July 1976 – 1 March 1988
- 141st Security Police Flight (later 141st Security Police Squadron), 1 July 1976 – 1 January 1993

Other

- 141st USAF Clinic (later 141st Medical Squadron, 141st Medical Group), 1 July 1976 – present

=== Stations ===
- Fairchild Air Force Base, Washington, 1 July 1976 – present

=== Aircraft ===
- Boeing KC-135A Stratotanker, 1976–1982
- Boeing KC-135E Stratotanker, 1982–2006
- RC-26B Metroliner, 2004–present
- Boeing KC-135R Stratotanker, 2006–present
