= 116th Air Refueling Squadron =

Washington Air National Guard unit

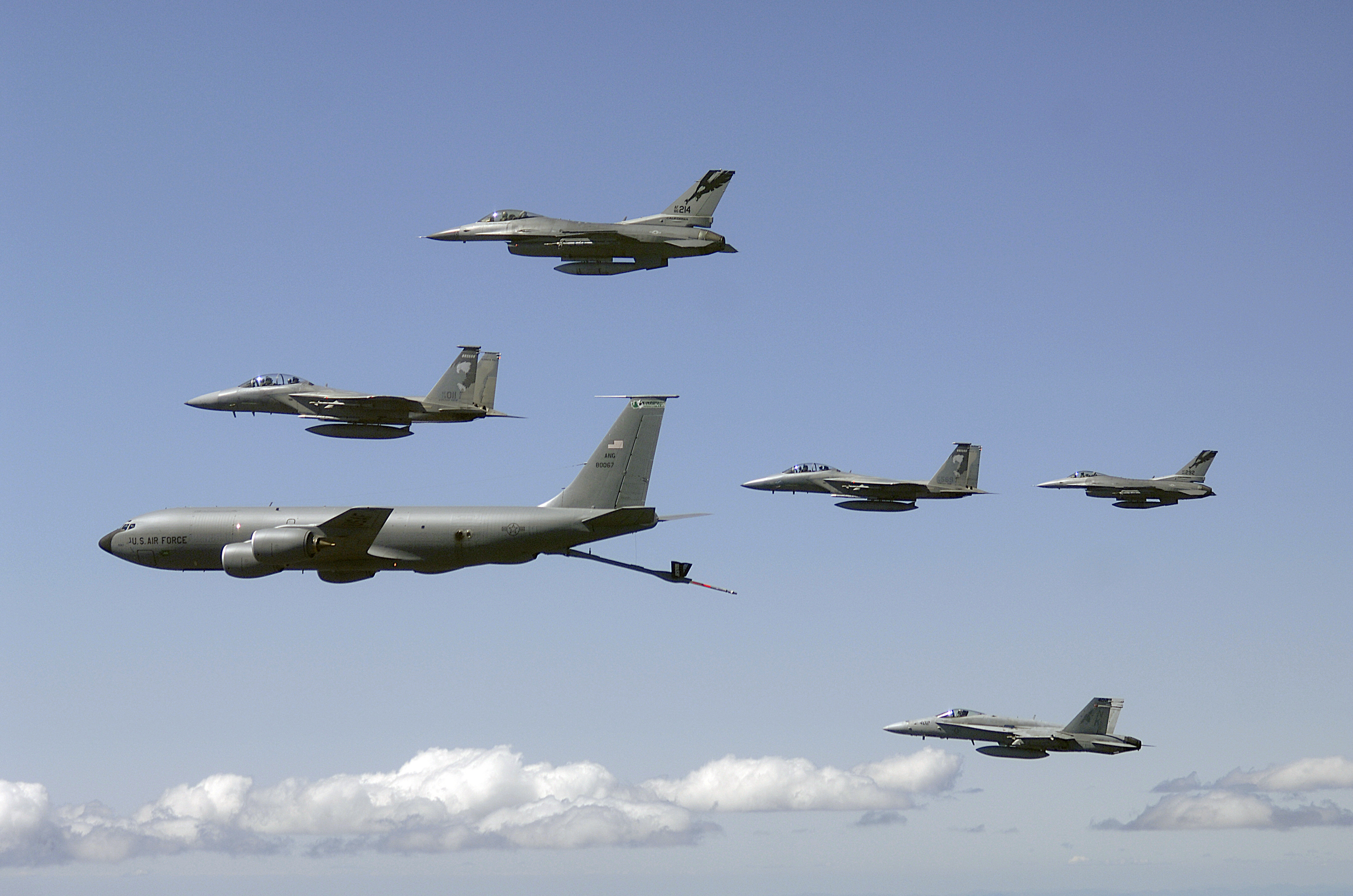
- 116th Air Refueling Squadron KC-135 Stratotanker refueling fighters 2007
- Active: 1917–1919; 1924–1943; 1945–1952; 1952–present
- Country: United States
- Allegiance: Washington
- Branch: Air National Guard
- Type: Squadron
- Role: Aerial refueling
- Part of: Washington Air National Guard
- Garrison/HQ: Fairchild Air Force Base, Washington
- Nickname: Ace of Spades
- Motto: Caveat Hostis (Latin for 'Let the Enemy Beware')

Insignia
- 116th Air Refueling Squadron emblem

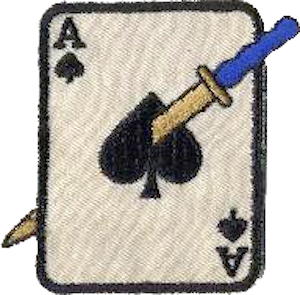
- 116th Observation Squadron Emblem (Note: Approved 6 July 1931.)

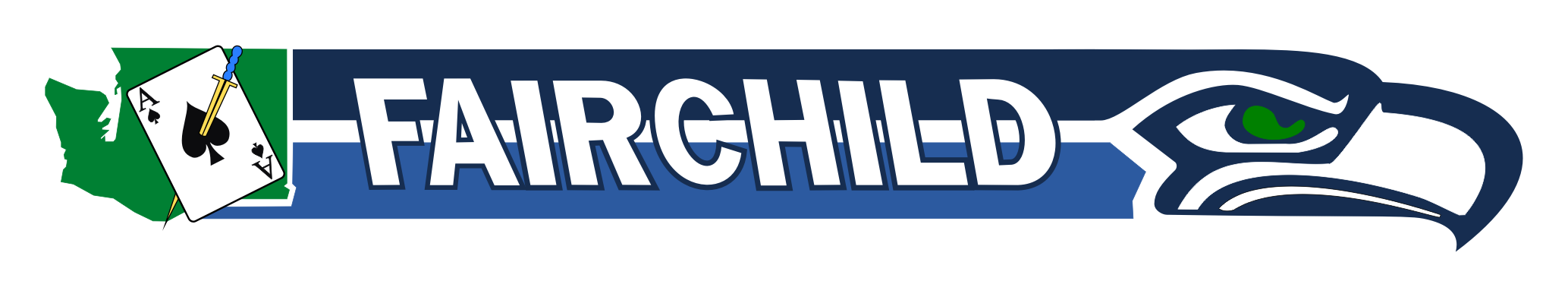
- Tail stripe

The 116th Air Refueling Squadron is a unit of the Washington Air National Guard 141st Air Refueling Wing located at Fairchild Air Force Base, Washington. The 116th was equipped with variants of the Boeing KC-135 Stratotanker from 1976 until 2007, at which time these aircraft were reassigned to other units as a result of BRAC 2005.

The squadron is a descendant organization of the World War I 116th Aero Squadron, established on 28 August 1917. It was reformed on 6 August 1924, as the 116th Observation Squadron, and is one of the 29 original National Guard Observation Squadrons of the United States Army National Guard formed before World War II.

== History ==
=== World War I ===
The 116th Air Refueling Squadron traces its origins to 29 August 1917 with the organization of the 116th Aero Squadron at Kelly Field, Texas. The squadron consisted of 80 men reporting from Jefferson Barracks, St. Louis, Missouri and 40 men from Vancouver Barracks, Washington. Additional men were transferred into the squadron, bringing the total to 150. Initially, the squadron was trained in basic indoctrination into the Army, with drill, fatigue duty, classroom training, and other things that are done in military training camps. During its time at Kelly Field, men were transferred in and out of the squadron, depending on their qualifications and the needs of other units in training. Once basic indoctrination training was completed, the 116th was ordered to report to the Aviation Concentration Center, Garden City, Long Island on 26 October. On 7 December, the squadron was ordered to move by train to Halifax, Nova Scotia, where it boarded the RMS Tunician, and began its trans-Atlantic crossing. It arrived in Liverpool, England on 26 December and was moved immediately by train to Southampton. It remained at Southampton until the 29th when the squadron crossed the English Channel, arriving on 29 December at Le Havre, France.

In France, the squadron was ordered to the Replacement Concentration Center, AEF, St. Maixent Replacement Barracks, France, arriving on 2 January 1918 for further assignment. On 17 January 1918, the squadron was again moved, this time to Romorantin Aerodrome, in central France. There, along with the 75th Aero Squadron and the 109th Aero Squadron, it was part of the first regular detachments of Americans to be stationed at the airfield. It was quartered in French barracks at the Camp de Bluets, on the outskirts of the town of Romorantin. Members of the squadrons were at once put into construction work to develop the Air Service Production Center No. 2. Work was performed in erecting buildings and also the construction of a railroad line into the camp next to the airfield. After several weeks of basic construction at the camp, much of the work was transferred to Chinese laborers who began to arrive and the Americans were placed in charge of details of these workers. On 1 February, the designation of the squadron was changed from the 116th to the 637th Aero Squadron.

On 4 February, the 637th was again ordered to move, being transferred to Colombey-les-Belles Airdrome. It arrived on 6 February, being the 4th Aero Squadron to arrive at the Zone of Advance (Western Front). At Colombey the squadron was assigned to construction of the 1st Air Depot. Work consisted of the construction of barracks, bomb shelters, ditching and draining the land so streets and utility lines could be laid. Also, the construction of a large flying field was begun. Once the basic construction was completed, the majority of ongoing construction was again performed by Chinese laborers brought in to complete the work. The 637th was assigned to the 1st Air Depot as a supply squadron. The men were assigned to warehouse duties, storing new equipment and all manner of supplies that arrived at the center, and issuing and delivering the necessities of operating the center to the various units and divisions of the station. The squadron was tasked in maintaining accurate inventory records and advising the commander of shortages and ordering additional or new equipment from Depots in France. The 637th was also responsible for the operation of the various mess halls, with squadron members acting as cooks, bakers and performing dish washing duties.

After the signing of the Armistice with Germany on 11 November, some men of the squadron were assigned to transportation and convoy duty, driving trucks performing collection of equipment from front-line units and also moving personnel back from the lines. The 637th Aero Squadron returned to the United States in late May 1919. It arrived at Mitchel Field, New York, where the squadron members were demobilized and returned to civilian life.

=== Washington National Guard ===
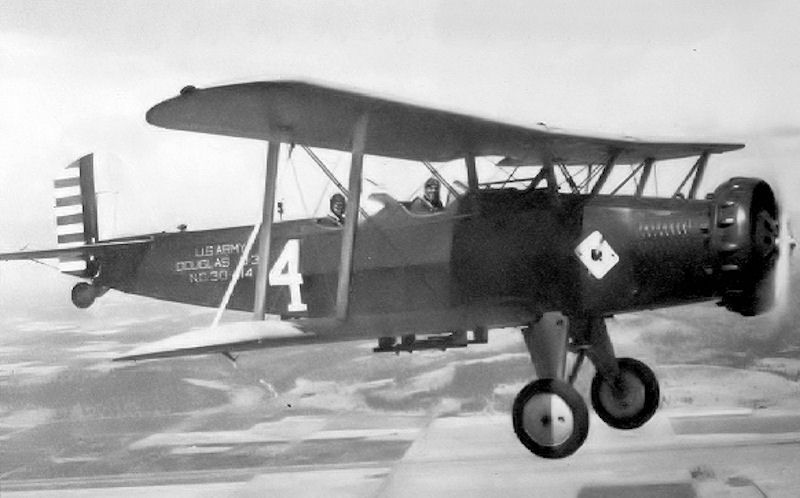
116th Observation Squadron – Douglas O-38 30-414

In 1924, the Adjutant General for the Washington National Guard, who was traveling through Spokane, made a simple proposal to the city fathers. Whichever city, Spokane, Seattle or Tacoma, could raise $10,000 first for building hangars would get an observation squadron. As the general's westward train pulled out of the station and was approaching the city limits, a telegraph wire sent out ahead of the train stated, "The $10,000 has been raised. We want the squadron."

On 6 August 1924 the 116th Observation Squadron, Washington National Guard, received federal recognition. They established their unit headquarters at the former Parkwater Municipal Golf Course (now Felts Field) near Spokane. Major John T. "Jack" Fancher, a World War I veteran, was the unit's first commander.

By early 1925, construction of the new hangars began with federally funded building materials, locally bought concrete and the squadron members themselves donating most of the labor. The 116th soon received its first airplanes, three Curtiss JN-6-A2 "Jenny" aircraft, a derivative of the Curtiss JN-4. They arrived at the rail yards still in the crates; however, no funds were provided to transport or construct the planes for use. A few creative enlisted men managed to haul, assemble and fire up these planes with oil donated by local businesses and gasoline bought on Fancher's personal credit. The 116th was the first National Guard unit to achieve full flight qualifications for every officer in the unit.

In April 1928, Fancher was attempting to dispose of unexpended pyrotechnics left from an aerial demonstration at the Washington State Apple Blossom Festival in Wenatchee. The ordnance detonated while Fancher was carrying it, resulting in his death a few hours later. Flight instructor Caleb V. Haynes succeeded him in command of the 116th.

In the late 1930s, the unit, tasked by the federal government to perform an aerial survey of the Columbia River, provided invaluable information to geologists and engineers for the site selection and construction of Grand Coulee Dam, the largest dam in the world at the time.

=== World War II ===
In response to President Franklin D. Roosevelt's Executive Order 8530, the 116th went into federal active duty effective 16 September 1940. The unit's first prominent World War II duties occurred immediately after the bombing of Pearl Harbor by the Japanese when the unit was assigned to Gray Field at Fort Lewis, Washington, flying anti-submarine patrols along the Pacific Coast. The squadron swelled in numbers as new draftees were added to the roster and it underwent a number of moves to various airfields. Finally, after being assigned to Will Rogers Field, Oklahoma it would be disbanded in 1943. The experienced pilots and crews were split up to provide training and leadership to newer draftee units. The experiences and assignments of the unit members during the war were as varied as the men themselves which can be attested to in a few of these brief accounts:

=== Washington Air National Guard ===
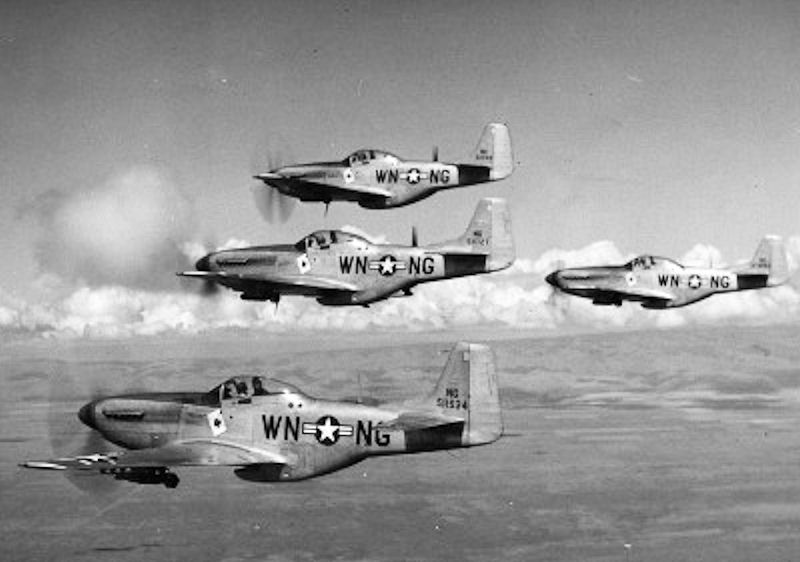
116th Fighter Squadron – P-51 Mustangs, 1949

The 116th Tactical Reconnaissance Squadron was reconstituted on 21 June 1945. It was then redesignated as the 116th Fighter Squadron and allotted to the National Guard on 24 May 1946. It was organized at Felts Field, Spokane, Washington and was extended federal recognition on 1 July 1947. The 116th Fighter Squadron was equipped with F-51D Mustangs and was allocated to Washington ANG 142d Air Defense Group, with a mission of the air defense of Eastern Washington.

The short runway and other issues with Felts Field led to the movement of the squadron to the larger Geiger Field on 1 July 1948. In March 1950 the squadron received five F-84C Thunderjets. The F-84s were received from the 33d Fighter Group at Otis Air Force Base, Massachusetts.

==== Korean War activation ====
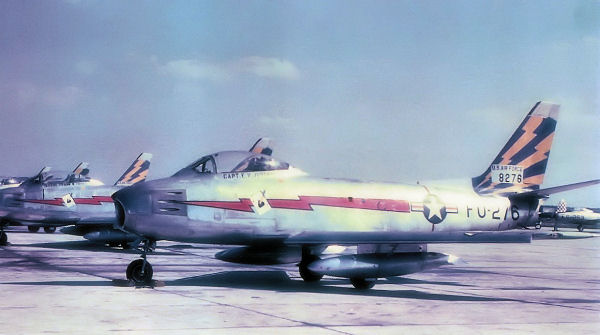
North American F-86A Sabre, serial 48-0276 of the 116th Fighter-Interceptor Squadron, 1951, RAF Bentwaters.

As a result of the Korean War, the 116th Fighter Squadron was federalized and brought to active-duty on 1 February 1951. The squadron was assigned to the 81st Fighter-Interceptor Group and moved to Moses Lake Air Force Base, Washington. The squadron was redesignated the 116th Fighter-Interceptor Squadron. The 81st was assigned to Tactical Air Command as a replacement squadron for the group's 93d Fighter-Interceptor Squadron which was at Kirtland Air Force Base, New Mexico performing air defense duties at the Sandia National Laboratories. It was converted from the F-51s and F-80s to F-86A Sabre jet fighters and performed transition training at Moses Lake.

After only four months of training, the squadron was ordered to RAF Shepherds Grove, England, to bolster NATO forces in Europe. The move was the first time in aviation history a National Guard fighter squadron would cross over to Europe under its own power and only the second time such a move was ever attempted without air refueling.

RAF Shepherds Grove was a former World War II RAF Fighter Command base located in East Anglia. The bulk of the ground station buildings were the metal Nissen hut type, with some wood frame and tar paper buildings, and were grouped together in numbered "sites", widely separated to blend into natural, rustic surroundings for purposes of camouflage. The main administrative building and clubs were of the larger Quonset hut type.

Headquarters of the 81st Group was located at RAF Bentwaters, and the 116th joined with RAF Fighter Command to provide air defense of Great Britain. The 81st was the first F-86 equipped unit in Europe. On 1 November 1952, the federalized 116th was returned to the Washington National Guard and its personnel and equipment transferred to the newly activated 78th Fighter-Interceptor Squadron.

==== Cold War ====
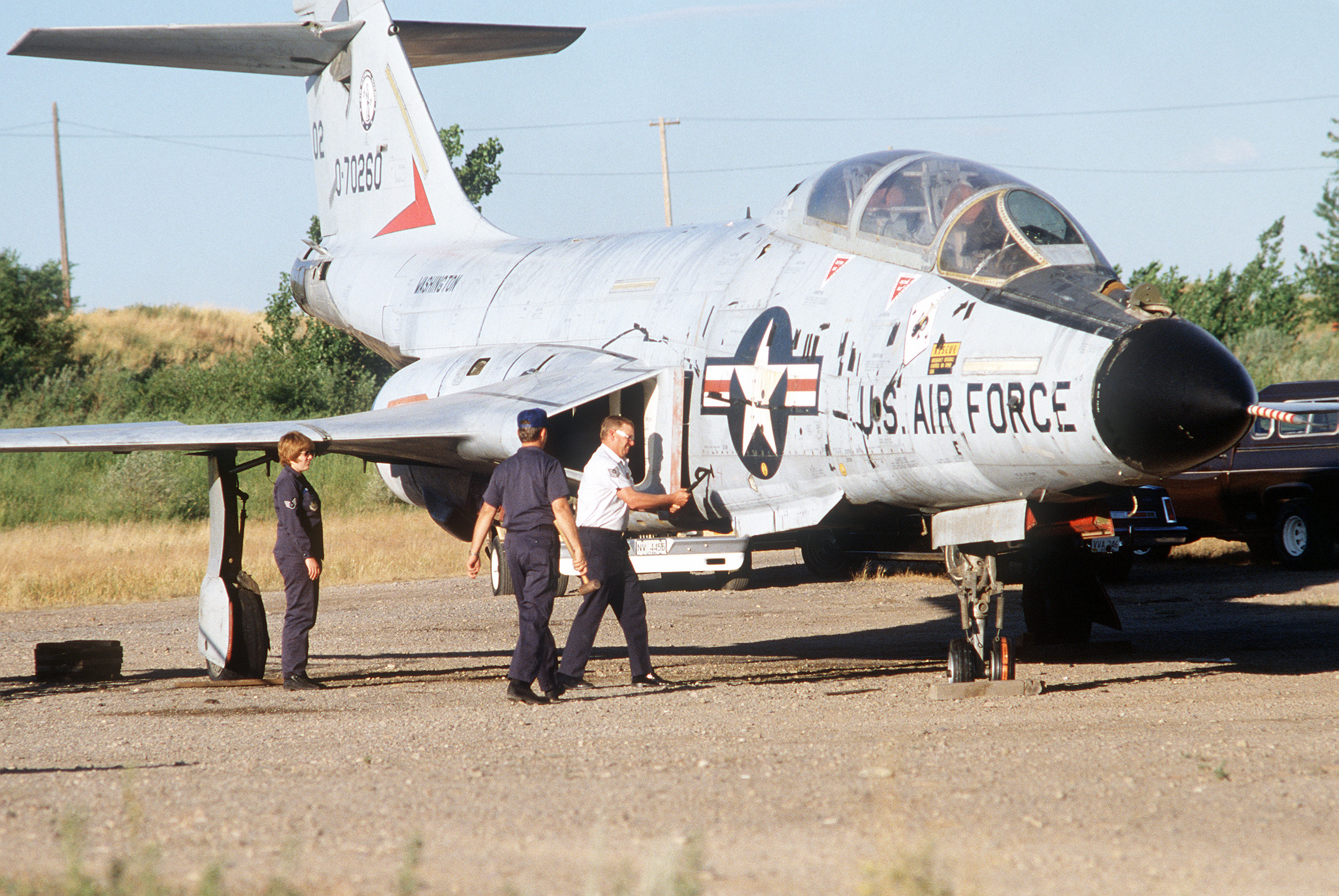
116th FIS F-101B Voodoo, 57–0260 at the Hill AFB, Utah museum, 1981

Upon its return from England, the 116th was organized and re-equipped with F-86A Sabre interceptors and again assigned to the 142d Fighter Group. It resumed its peacetime mission of the air defense of eastern Washington. For the next 23 years the squadron performed that mission, being upgraded by ADC in 1955 to the dedicated F-94 Starfire all-weather interceptor. With this new aircraft, the mission of the 116th Fighter Interceptor Squadron changed from day interceptor to day and night all-weather interceptor. In 1957 the 116th again upgraded to the improved F-89D Scorpion, followed later by the nuclear armed F-89J, then in May 1965 to the supersonic F-102A Delta Dagger. In 1969 it received the Mach-2 F-101B Voodoo.

1967 was a "trophy" year for the 141st Fighter Group and the 116th. Trophies and awards received included the Spaatz Trophy for the most Outstanding Air National Guard Flying Unit, the Air National Guard Outstanding Unit Plaque, the Air Force Outstanding Unit Trophy and the Winston P. Wilson Award. In 1969, the unit accumulated an outstanding record, 37,900 accident-free flying hours, receiving the 25th Air Division Flying Safety Award five years in a row.

==== Air Refueling mission ====
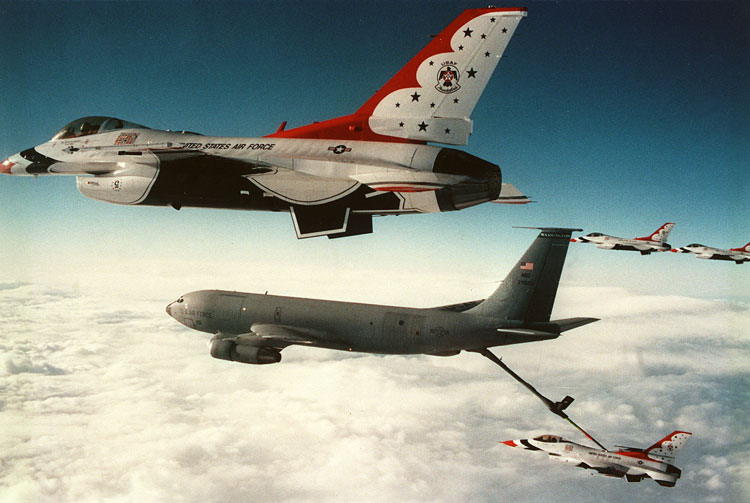
A Thunderbird F-16C refuels from a 141st ARW KC-135E.

In July 1976, the 116th converted to the KC-135 Stratotanker, becoming the fifth Air National Guard unit to join the Strategic Air Command (SAC). The new air refueling squadron moved from Geiger Field to nearby Fairchild Air Force Base to accommodate the larger aircraft.

During the 1990 Gulf Crisis Aircrew, maintenance and support personnel responded to the Iraq invasion of Kuwait on 2 August 1990, and deployed to Jeddah, Saudi Arabia. Upon federal activation in December 1990, all eight of the unit's KC-135's deployed to the Middle East. The 116th refueled coalition attack aircraft during Operation Desert Storm.

In December 1992, the unit responded with aircrew and support personnel for Operation Restore Hope, a United Nations relief mission to aid hunger victims in Somalia, flying missions from Moron AB, Spain. June 1995, several rotations deployed to Pisa, Italy, for Operation Deny Flight, NATO mission enforcing the no-fly zone over Bosnia-Herzegovina. In May 1999, six KC-135E's deployed to Budapest, Hungary in support of Operation Allied Force to deter ethnic aggressions in Yugoslavia.

On 13 January 1999, one of the unit's KC-135E's crashed at Geilenkirchen Air Base, Germany, killing all four crew members. This was the first time the unit lost an aircraft or lives since beginning the aerial refueling mission in 1976. A monument was erected at the site the following year.

==== Global War on Terrorism ====
After the 11 September 2001 attacks, the squadron began refueling flights supporting Operation Noble Eagle almost immediately. In 2002 a new digital navigation system, called Pacer CRAG, was added to the aircraft and crews trained to function without a navigator. Members of the 116th also joined the thousands of Guard and Reserve forces called up to deploy all over the world in support of America's "War on Terror."

When the first Guard KC-135 R-model landed at Fairchild in January 2003, with its new engines, it became the 40th different airplane the 116th pilots had flown since it was created back in 1924. Each one of the four engines of the KC-135R produces over 21,000 pounds of thrust. The unit's first plane, the JN-6-A2 "Jenny," had a wooden body covered in fabric and only weighed 1,430 pounds.

At the time President George W. Bush ordered coalition military units into Iraq during Operation Iraqi Freedom in March 2003, the 116th was in a training status to transition into the R model KC-135. Since then the 116th has supported continuous deployments including antiterrorism efforts abroad under Operation Enduring Freedom and air refueling missions over the US for homeland defense flights under Operation Noble Eagle.

During a banquet ceremony in July 2003, the 141st Air Refueling Wing accepted the coveted Solano Trophy marking the wing as the best Air National Guard unit in the Fifteenth Air Force.

Overseas deployments and homeland security refueling missions have dominated the tasking landscape for the squadron since 2004.

==== Base realignment and closure (BRAC) 2005 ====
In response to the Congress-mandated 2005 Base Realignment and Closure process, the last of the KC-135 Stratotankers belonging to the 141st Air Refueling Wing were redirected to Iowa, and as of 1 October 2007 116th crew members now share aircraft with the active duty 92d Air Refueling Wing.

Today, 116th crews still deploy around the world to fulfill Air Expeditionary Force commitments.

== Lineage ==
637th Aero Squadron

- Organized as 116th Aero Squadron on 29 August 1917 (Note: This unit is not related to another 116th Aero Squadron (Service) that was activated in March 1918 at Kelly Field, Texas, moved to Souther Field, Florida in May, was redesignated Squadron B, Souther Field in July and demovilized in November 1918.)

Redesignated 116th Aero Squadron (Service) on 1 September 1917
Redesignated 637th Aero Squadron (Supply) on 1 February 1918
Demobilized on 20 May 1919
Reconstituted and consolidated with the 116th Observation Squadron in 1936

116th Air Refueling Squadron

- Organied as the 116th Observation Squadron and allotted to Washington NG

Activated on 6 August 1924
Consolidated with the 637th Aero Squadron in 1936
Ordered to active service on 16 September 1940
Redesignated 116th Observation Squadron (Medium) on 13 January 1942
Redesignated 116th Observation Squadron on 4 July 1942
Redesignated 116th Reconnaissance Squadron (Fighter) on 2 April 1943
Redesignated 116th Tactical Reconnaissance Squadron on 11 August 1943
Disbanded on 30 November 1943
Reconstituted on 21 June 1945
Redesignated 116th Fighter Squadron and allotted to the National Guard on 24 May 1946
Extended federal recognition on 1 July 1946
Federalized and placed on active duty on 10 February 1951
Redesignated 116th Fighter-Interceptor Squadron on 10 February 1951
Released from active duty and returned to Washington state control on 1 November 1952
Redesignated 116th Fighter Squadron on 7 July 1960
Redesignated 116th Air Refueling Squadron on 1 July 1976

=== Assignments ===
- Post Headquarters, Kelly Field, 29 August-31 October 1917
- Aviation Concentration Center, 31 October – 7 December 1917
- Replacement Concentration Center, AEF, 2–18 January 1918
- Air Service Production Center No. 2, AEF, 18 January-6 February 1918
- 1st Air Depot, AEF, 6 February 1918 – April 1919
- Post Headquarters, Mitchel Field, 11–20 May 1919
- Washington National Guard (divisional aviation, 41st Division), 6 August 1924
- Ninth Corps Area, 16 September 1940
- Fourth Army, 3 October 1940
- IX Army Corps, c. November 1940
- Fourth Air Force, 1 September 1941
- IV Air Support Command, 3 September 1941
- 70th Observation Group (later 70th Reconnaissance Group, 70th Tactical Reconnaissance Group), 13 September 1941 – 30 November 1943
- 142d Fighter Group, 1 July 1946
- Fourth Air Force, 1 February 1951
- 81st Fighter-Interceptor Group, 10 February 1951 – 1 November 1952 (attached to 81st Fighter-Interceptor Wing until August 1951)
- 142d Fighter-Interceptor Group, 1 November 1952
- 142d Air Defense Wing, 16 April 1956
- 141st Fighter Group (later 141st fighter-Interceptor Group) c. January 1960
- 141st Air Refueling Wing, 1 July 1976
- 141st Operations Group, 1 June 1992 – present

=== Stations ===
- Kelly Field, Texas, 29 August 1917
- Aviation Concentration Center, Garden City, New York, 31 October – 7 December 1917
- St. Maixent Replacement Barracks, France, 2 January 1918
- Romorantin Aerodrome, France, 18 January 1918
- Colombey-les-Belles Airdrome, France, 6 February 1918 – April 1919
- Mitchel Field, New York, c. 11–20 May 1919
- Felts Field, Washington, 6 August 1924
- Gray Field, Washington, 24 September 1940

Detachments operated from Yakima, Washington, 16 March – 1 May 1942
Detachments operated from Hoquiam, Washington, 25 May 1942 –

- Corvallis Army Air Field, Oregpn, 9 March 1943
- Redmond Army Air Field, Oregon, 16 August 1943
- Corvallis Army Air Field, Oregon, 30 October 1943
- Will Rogers Field, Oklahoma, 14–30 November 1943.
- Felts Field, Washington, 1 July 1946
- Geiger Field, Washington, 1 July 1948
- Moses Lake Air Force Base, Washington, 10 February 1951
- RAF Shepherds Grove, England, 3 September 1951 – 1 November 1952
- Geiger Field, Washington, 1 November 1952
- Fairchild Air Force Base, Washington, 1 July 1976 – present

=== Aircraft ===
- DeHavilland DH-4, 1924–1928
- JN-6 Jenny, 1925–1926
- TW-3 Chummy, 1925–1928
- Douglas O-2, 1926–1934
- Consolidated PT-1, 1927–1929
- Consolidated O-17, 1928–1934
- Douglas O-38, 1931–1940
- O-49 Vigilant, 1940–1941
- North American O-47, 1940–1946
- Bell P-39 Airacobra, 1943–1946
- F-51D Mustang, 1946–1950
- F-84C Thunderjet, 1950
- F-86A Sabre, 1950–1955
- F-94A Starfire, 1955–1957
- F-89J Scorpion, 1957–1965
- F-102A Delta Dagger, 1966–1969
- F-101B Voodoo, 1969–1976
- KC-135A Stratotanker, 1976–1982
- KC-135E Stratotanker, 1982–2006
- RC-26B Metroliner, 2004–present
- KC-135R Stratotanker, 2006–2007

== See also ==
- List of American aero squadrons
- List of observation squadrons of the United States Army National Guard
