= Fairchild Air Force Base =

US Air Force base near Spokane, Washington, US

- Near Spokane, Washington in the United States
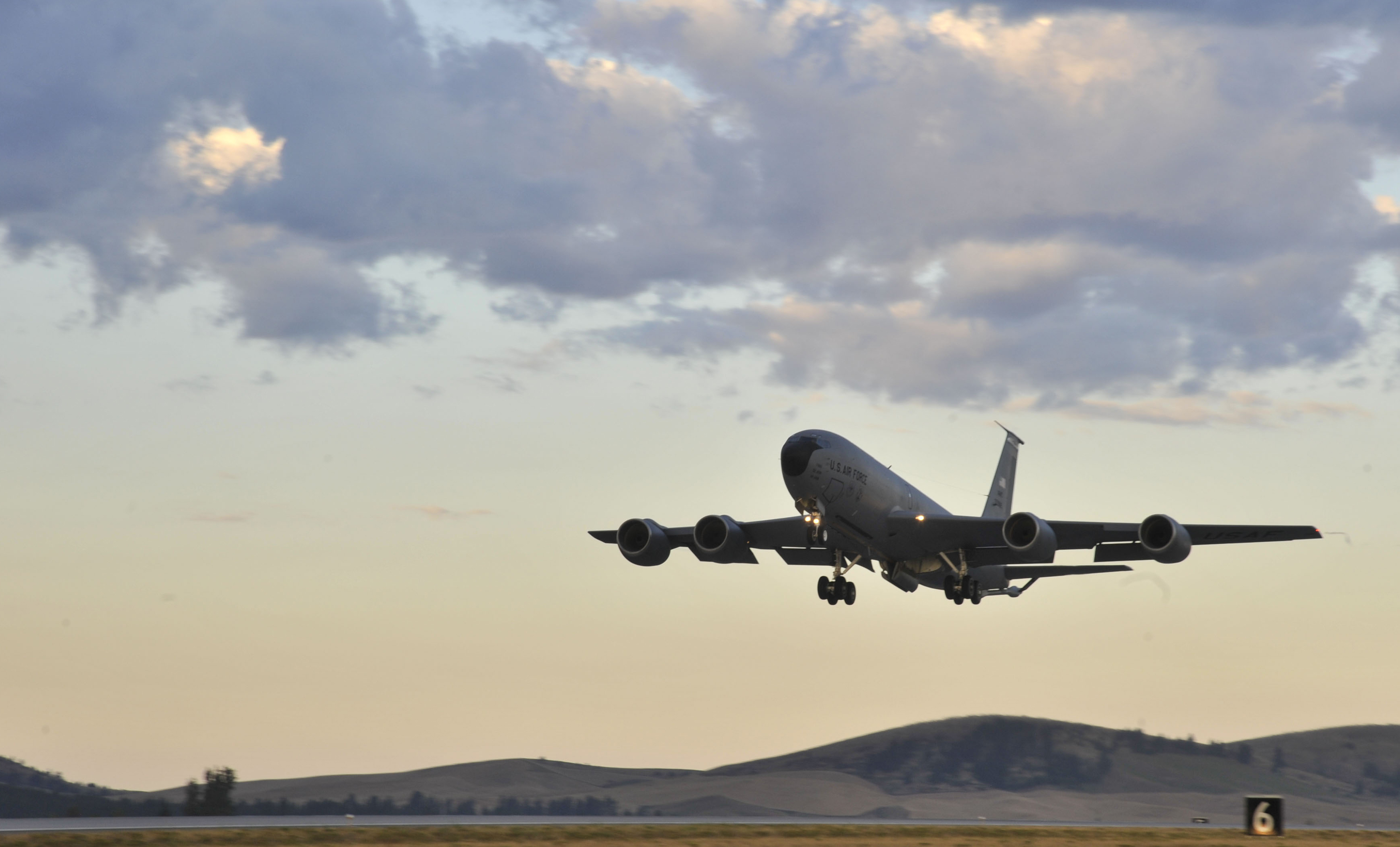
- 92nd Air Refueling Wing's KC-135 Stratotanker departs Fairchild AFB in 2014

Site information
- Type: U.S. Air Force Base
- Owner: Department of Defense
- Operator: United States Air Force
- Controlled by: Air Mobility Command (AMC)
- Condition: Operational
- Website: www.fairchild.af.mil

Location
- Location within North America Location within the United States Location within Washington (state)
- Coordinates: 47°36′54″N 117°39′20″W

Site history
- Built: 1942; 84 years ago
- In use: 1942–present

Garrison information
- Current commander: Colonel Chad K. Cisewski
- Garrison: 92nd Air Refueling Wing

Airfield information
- Identifiers: IATA: SKA, ICAO: KSKA, FAA LID: SKA, WMO: 727855
- Elevation: 2,462 feet (750.4 m) AMSL
Runways
Direction	Length and surface
05/23	13,899 feet (4,236.4 m) Concrete

Fairchild Air Force Base (AFB) (IATA: SKA, ICAO: KSKA, FAA LID: SKA) is a United States Air Force base, located in the northwest United States in eastern Washington, approximately twelve miles (20 km) southwest of Spokane.

The host unit at Fairchild is the 92nd Air Refueling Wing (92 ARW) assigned to the Air Mobility Command's Eighteenth Air Force. The 92 ARW is responsible for providing air refueling, as well as passenger and cargo airlift and aero-medical evacuation missions supporting U.S. and coalition conventional operations as well as U.S. Strategic Command strategic deterrence missions.

Fairchild AFB was established 84 years ago in 1942 as the Spokane Army Air Depot. and is named in honor of General Muir S. Fairchild (1894–1950); a World War I aviator from the state, he was the Vice Chief of Staff of the Air Force at the time of his death.

During the Cold War, Fairchild was a Strategic Air Command (SAC) base for 45 years (1947–1992), with bombers and tankers, as well as missiles for a brief period (1960–1965).

As of 2018, the 92d Air Refueling Wing was commanded by Colonel Derek Salmi. Its Command Chief Master Sergeant was Chief Master Sergeant Lee Mills.

== History ==
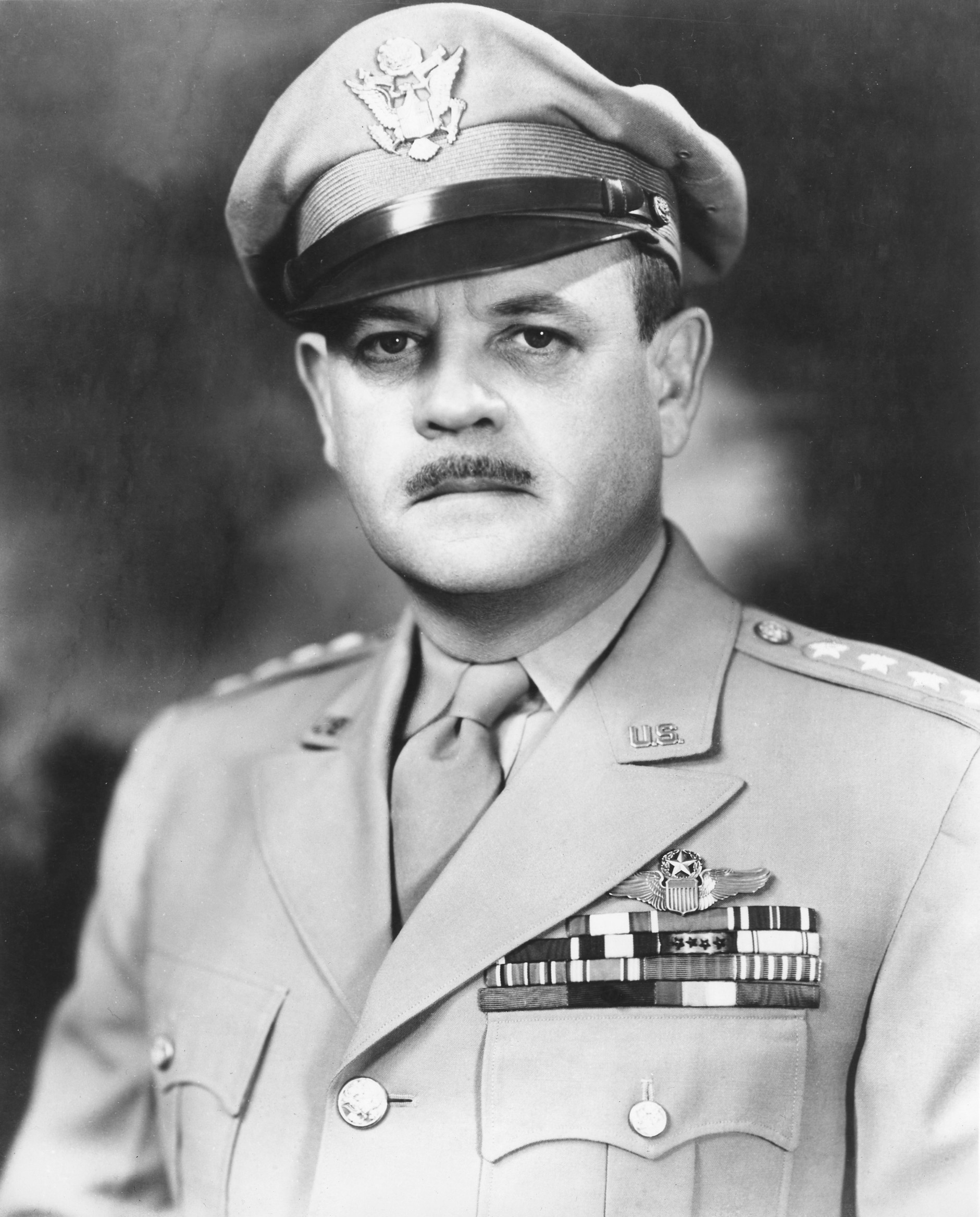
General Muir Fairchild

Fairchild Air Force Base is named in honor of General Muir S. Fairchild (1894–1950). Born in Bellingham, he graduated from Olympia High School and attended the University of Washington in Seattle.

Fairchild received his wings and commission in 1918, and served as a pilot during World War I. He held various air staff positions during World War II and received his fourth star in 1948. While serving as Vice Chief of Staff of the Air Force, he died on 17 March 1950.

=== Operational history ===
Since 1942, Fairchild Air Force Base/Station has been a key part of the United States' defense strategy—from World War II repair depot, to Strategic Air Command bomber wing during the Cold War, to Air Mobility Command air refueling wing during Operation IRAQI FREEDOM. Today, Fairchild's aircraft and personnel make up the backbone of the Air Force's tanker fleet on the west coast.

Fairchild's location, twelve miles (20 km) west of Spokane, resulted from a competition with the cities of Seattle and Everett in western Washington. The War Department chose Spokane for several reasons: better weather conditions for flying, the location 300 miles (480 km) from the coast, and the Cascade Range providing a natural barrier against possible Japanese attack.

As an added incentive to the War Department, many Spokane businesses and public-minded citizens donated money to purchase land for the base. At a cost of more than $125,000, these people bought 1,400 acres (5.7 km^{2}) and presented the title to the War Department in January 1942. That year, the government designated $14 million to purchase more land and begin construction of a new Spokane Army Air Depot.

Spokane Air Depot was served by a rail connection to the Great Northern Railway.

From 1942 until 1946, the base served as a repair depot for damaged aircraft returning from the Pacific Theater. The depot command at the base went through several name changes, at one point being designated the Spokane Air Technical Service Command. Effective at 2359L on 31 August 1947, the base was transferred to the Strategic Air Command (SAC) and assigned to the 15th Air Force (15 AF). Beginning in the summer of 1947, the 92nd and 98th Bomb Groups arrived. Both of the units flew the most advanced bomber of the day, the B-29 Superfortress. In January 1948, the base received the second of its three official names: Spokane Air Force Base.

With the outbreak of the Korean War in 1950, both groups deployed to Japan and Guam. The 92d departed on 4 July 1950 and the 98th followed in August. After only a few months, General MacArthur released the 92nd to return to the states while the 98th remained in the Far East. The 98th was then reassigned to Nebraska. Upon its return to Fairchild, the 92nd was re-designated the 92d Bombardment Wing (Heavy). In November 1950, the base took its current name in memory of Air Force Vice Chief of Staff, General Muir S. Fairchild, a native of Bellingham. The general entered service as a sergeant with the Washington National Guard in June 1916 and was an aviator in World War I. He died at his quarters at Fort Myer while on duty in the Pentagon in March 1950. The formal dedication ceremony was held 20 July 1951, to coincide with the arrival of the wing's first B-36 Peacemaker.

=== B-52 Stratofortress and KC-135 Stratotanker ===
In 1956, the wing began a conversion that brought the first of 45 B-52 Stratofortress bombers on 26 March 1957 to Fairchild, followed by first of twenty KC-135 Stratotanker on 21 February 1958. In 1961, the 92d became the first "aerospace" wing in the nation with the acquisition of the Atlas-E intercontinental ballistic missile, operated by the 567th Strategic Missile Squadron. With the new role and the addition of missiles, the 92d Bomb Wing was re-designated the 92d Strategic Aerospace Wing. However, the designation remained longer than the missiles, as the Atlas missiles were soon obsolete and removed in 1965.

The weapons storage area (WSA) for the bombers was located south of the runway at Deep Creek Air Force Station, a separate installation constructed from 1950 to 1953 by the Atomic Energy Commission (AEC) and operated by the Air Materiel Command. The facility was one of the thirteen original sites built for storage, maintenance, and operational readiness of the nuclear stockpile. Deep Creek became part of Fairchild AFB on 1 July 1962, with operations transferred to SAC.

On 15 March 1966, the 336th Combat Crew Training Group was established at Fairchild. In 1971, the group became a wing and assumed control over all Air Force survival schools. Later reduced to a group level command, the unit, now known as the 336th Training Group, continues this mission for the Air Education and Training Command (AETC).

To provide air defense of the base, U.S. Army Nike-Hercules surface-to-air missile sites were constructed during 1956/1957. Sites were located near Cheney (F-37) 47°32′30″N 117°32′46″W; Deep Creek (F-87) 47°39′29″N 117°42′55″W; Medical Lake (F-45) 47°35′10″N 117°40′32″W, and Spokane (F-07) 47°40′50″N 117°36′28″W. The Cheney site was active between 1957 – June 1960; Deep Creek Sep 1958 – March 1966; Medical Lake 1957 – March 1966 and the Spokane site between 1957 and June 1960.

On 16 October 1984, an unarmed B-52G (57–6479) from Fairchild crashed in northeast Arizona during a nighttime low-level training flight, with five survivors and two fatalities: the gunner and a colonel in the observer jump seat.

In 1985, Fairchild's fifteen B-52G aircraft were replaced with nineteen B-52H; a slightly newer version with more powerful turbofan engines.

=== Air refueling ===
As military operations in Vietnam escalated in the mid-1960s, the demand for air refueling increased. Fairchild tanker crews became actively involved in Operation YOUNG TIGER, refueling combat aircraft in Southeast Asia. The wing's B-52s were not far behind, deploying to Andersen AFB on Guam for Operation Arc Light and the bombing campaign against enemy strongholds in Vietnam.

On 10 September 1962, an inbound KC-135A from Ellsworth AFB in South Dakota with 44 aboard crashed into fog-shrouded Mount Kit Carson, just west of Mount Spokane. The incident occurred late in the morning and there were no survivors; it was attributed to a navigational error by the crew. Less than five years later, another crash occurred in the same general area. Returning from Hickam AFB in Hawaii on 19 January 1967, a Fairchild-based KC-135A crashed southeast of Mount Spokane shortly after sunset; all nine on board were killed.

In late 1974, the Air Force announced plans to convert the 141st Fighter Interceptor Group of the Washington Air National Guard, an F-101 Voodoo unit at Geiger Field, to an air refueling mission with KC-135 aircraft. The unit would then be renamed the 141st Air Refueling Wing (141 ARW) and move to Fairchild. Work began soon thereafter and by 1976 eight KC-135E aircraft transferred to the new 141 ARW. Today, the 141 ARW continues its air mobility mission, flying the KC-135R model.

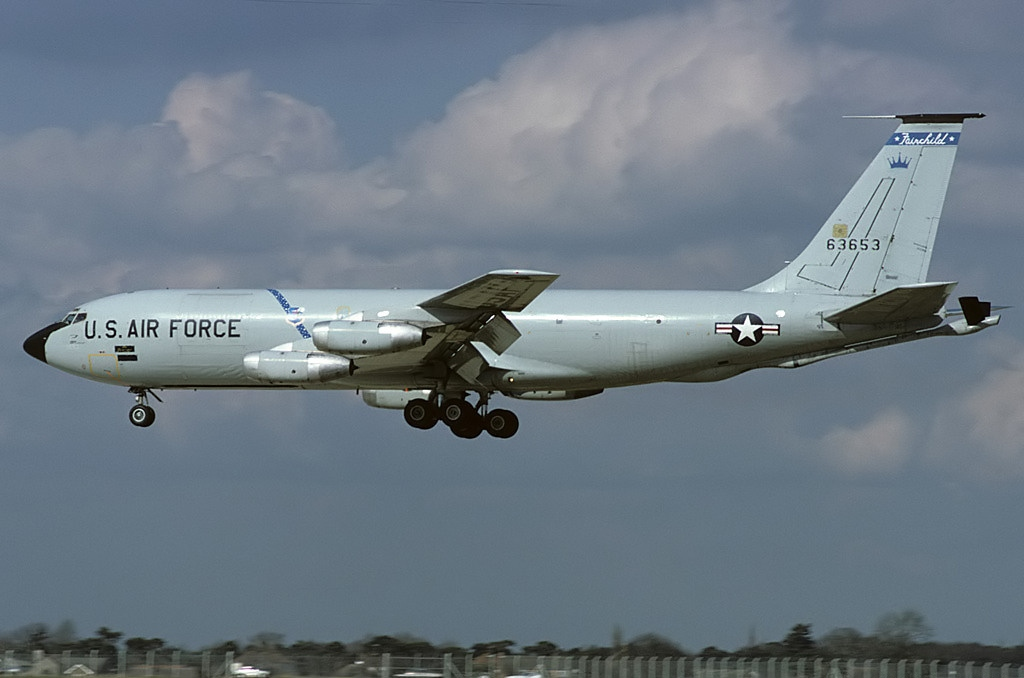
A Fairchild-based KC-135A Stratotanker seen during 1986

On 23 January 1987, following the inactivation of the 47th Air Division at Fairchild, the 92nd Bombardment Wing was reassigned to the 57th Air Division at Minot AFB in North Dakota. Less than two months later on 13 March, a KC-135A crashed into a field adjacent to the 92nd Bomb Wing headquarters and the taxiway during a practice flight for a low-level in-flight refueling demonstration planned for later that month. Seven were killed in the crash, all USAF personnel, six aboard the aircraft, and a motorist on the ground.

Following Iraq's invasion of Kuwait in August 1990, a total of 560 base personnel deployed to Desert Shield and Desert Storm from August 1990 to March 1991. The 43d and 92d Air Refueling Squadrons flew a combined total of 4,004 hours, 721 sorties, and off-loaded a total of 22.5 million pounds of fuel to coalition aircraft.

On 1 September 1991, under Air Force reorganization, the 92d Bombardment Wing (Heavy) was re-designated the 92d Wing, emphasizing a dual bombing and refueling role.

With the inactivation of the Strategic Air Command (SAC) in June 1992, the B-52 portion of the wing became part of the newly established Air Combat Command (ACC) and was re-designated the 92d Bomb Wing. As SAC finished 46 years of service to the nation, Fairchild bomber and tanker crews took top honors at Proud Shield '92, SAC's final bombing/navigation competition. The wing won the Fairchild Trophy for best bomber/tanker team as well as the Saunders Trophy for the tanker unit attaining the most points on all competition missions.

7 December 1993 marked the beginning of a significant change in the mission of Fairchild when the B-52s were transferred to another ACC base while the KC-135s, now assigned to the newly established Air Mobility Command (AMC) would remain. This was the first step in Fairchild's transition to an air refueling wing. The departure of B-52s continued throughout the spring of 1994, with most of the bombers gone by 25 May 1994.

=== Air refueling wing ===
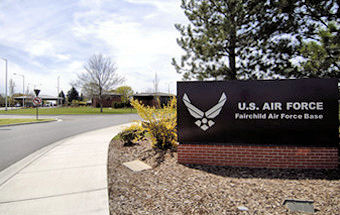
Entrance to Fairchild AFB in 2008

On 1 July 1994, the 92d Bomb Wing was re-designated the 92d Air Refueling Wing (92 ARW), and Fairchild AFB was transferred from ACC to Air Mobility Command (AMC) in a ceremony marking the creation of the largest air refueling wing in the Air Force. Dubbed as the new "tanker hub of the Northwest," the wing was capable of maintaining an air bridge across the nation and the world in support of US and allied forces.

Since 1994, the 92 ARW has been involved in many contingency missions around the world. 92 ARW KC-135s have routinely supported special airlift missions in response to world events or international treaty compliance requirements.

In 1995 aircraft from Fairchild flew to Travis AFB, California in support of its first Strategic Arms Reduction Treaty (START) mission, transporting Russian inspectors to sites in the Western U.S. The wing has flown START missions in the U.S. every year since. And in May 2000, the wing became the first active duty KC-135 unit to transport U.S. inspectors on a START mission into Ulan Ude, Russia.

Throughout much of the 1990s, the wing was actively involved in missions against Iraqi president Saddam Hussein. The wing also deployed aircraft and personnel in 1999 to support Operation Allied Force.

Following the destruction of the World Trade Center, the wing began providing around-the-clock air refueling of Combat Air Patrol fighter aircraft and initiated 24-hour ground alert operations in support of Operation Noble Eagle. The wing also began a series of extended Operation Enduring Freedom deployments for aircrews and maintainers as well as combat support and medical personnel.

=== Previous names ===
- Established as Galena Field (popular designation), renamed Spokane Air Depot, 1 March 1942
- Spokane Army Airfield, 9 July 1942
- Spokane Air Force Base, 13 January 1948
- Fairchild Air Force Base, 1 November 1950

=== Major commands to which assigned ===
- Air Service Command, 1 March 1942
- AAF Materiel and Services, 17 July 1944

Redesignated: AAF Technical Service Command, 31 August 1944
Redesignated: Air Technical Service Command, 1 July 1945
Redesignated: Air Materiel Command, 9 March 1946

- Strategic Air Command, 1 September 1947
- Air Combat Command, 1 June 1992
- Air Mobility Command, 1 July 1994 – present

=== Base operating units ===
- 15th Station Complement, 15 August 1942
- 498th Base HQ and Air Base Sq, 1 February 1943
- 4134th AAF Base Unit, 1 April 1944
- 203d AAF Base Unit, 1 September 1947
- 92d Airdrome Gp, 17 November 1947 (rdsgd 92d Air Base Gp, 12 July 1948)
- 814th Air Base Gp, 8 August 1952
- 92d Air Base Gp, 4 September 1957 (rdsgd several times since)-Present

=== Major units assigned ===
- 2d Air Service Area Command, 1 July 1941 – 9 September 1942
- 41st Air Base HQ & Air Base Group, 22 April 1941 – 31 March 1944
- 15th Station Complement Air Depot, 21 June 1942 – 4 February 1943
- Spokane Air Depot, 1 March 1942 – 1 September 1953
- 85th AAF Base Unit, 7 August 1944 – 20 October 1946
- 98th Bombardment Wing, 24 October 1947 – 15 August 1953
- 92d Bombardment (later Air Refueling) Wing, 17 November 1947 – present
- 90th Bombardment Wing, 2 January – 13 March 1951
- 111th Strategic Reconnaissance Group, 10 April 1951 – 1 January 1953
- 99th Strategic Reconnaissance Wing, 1 January 1953 – 1 September 1956
- 567th Strategic Missile Squadron (ICBM-Atlas), 1 April 1960 – 25 June 1965
- 3636th Combat Crew Training Wing, 2 April 1966 – 1 January 1993

Redesignated: 336th Air Refueling Wing, 1–29 January 1993
Redesignated: 336th Crew Training Group, 29 January 1993 – 1 April 1994
Resesignated: 336th Training Group (USAF Survival School), 1 April 1994 – present

- 47th Air Division, 30 June 1971 – 27 February 1987

References for history introduction, major commands and major units

=== Major aircraft and missiles assigned ===
- B-29 Superfortress, 1947–1952
- B-36 Peacemaker, 1951–1957
- B-52 Stratofortress, 1957–1994
- KC-135 Stratotanker, 1958–present
- SM-65E Atlas 1961–1965
- UH-1N Twin Huey, 1971–present

=== Intercontinental ballistic missile facilities ===
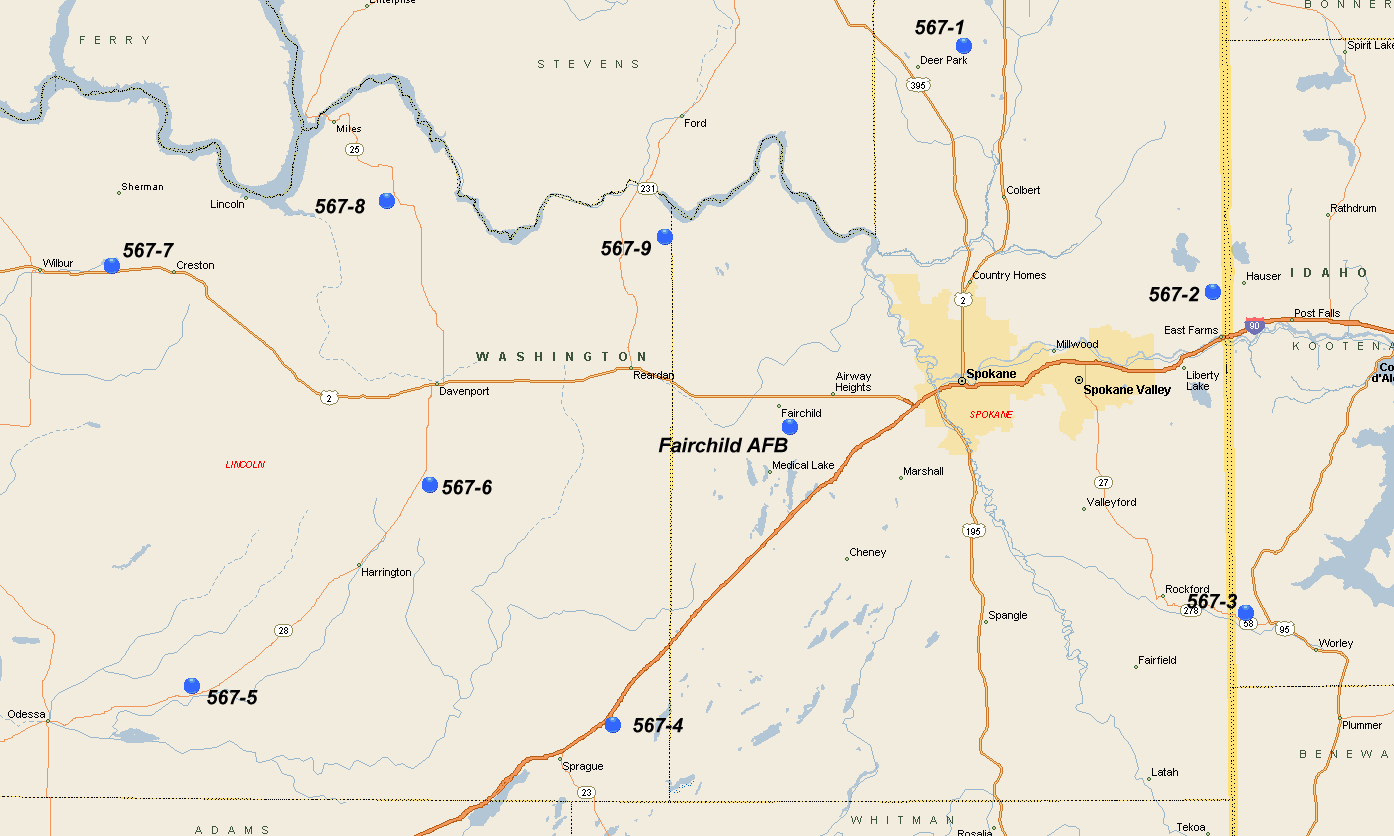
Atlas missile sites of Fairchild AFB

The 567th Strategic Missile Squadron operated nine SM-65E Atlas ICBM sites (1 April 1960 – 25 June 1965).

- 567–1, 3.4 mi ENE of Deer Park, Washington 47°58′30″N 117°24′32″W
- 567–2, 3.1 mi SE of Newman Lake, Washington 47°44′25″N 117°03′38″W
- 567–3, 5.3 mi ESE of Rockford, Washington 47°26′13″N 117°01′06″W
- 567–4, 4.0 mi NE of Sprague, Washington 47°19′58″N 117°54′11″W
- 567–5, 0.7 mi NW of Lamona, Washington 47°22′04″N 118°29′27″W
- 567–6, 6.5 mi S of Davenport, Washington 47°33′36″N 118°09′34″W
- 567–7, 4.4 mi E of Wilbur, Washington 47°45′52″N 118°36′31″W
- 567–8, 6.2 mi SW of Deer Meadows, Washington 47°49′40″N 118°13′21″W
- 567–9, 8.9 mi NNE of Reardan, Washington 47°47′42″N 117°49′51″W

On 14 July 1958, the Army Corps of Engineers Northern Pacific Division directed its Seattle District to begin survey and mapping operations for the first Atlas-E site to be located in the vicinity of Spokane. Originally, the Air Force wanted three sites with three missiles at each (3 x 3); however, in early 1959, the Air Force opted to disperse the missiles to nine individual sites as a defensive safety measure. Work started at Site A on 12 May 1959, and completion at Site I occurred on 10 February 1961. Auxiliary support facilities for each site were built concurrent with the launchers. Support facilities at Fairchild AFB, including a liquid oxygen plant, were completed by January 1961.

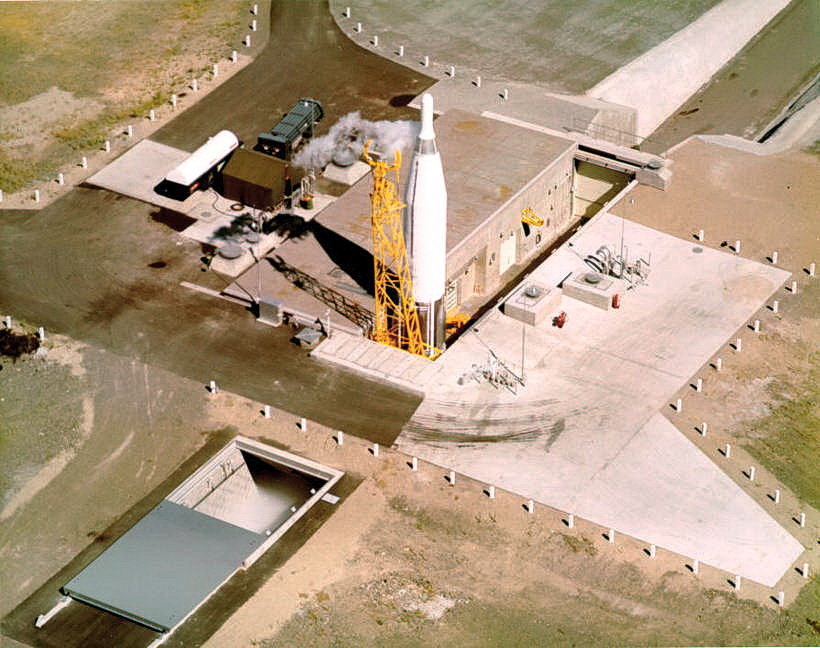
Atlas at Deer Park (567–1) in 1961

Activation of the 567th Strategic Missile Squadron on 1 April 1960, marked the first time SAC activated an E series Atlas unit. On 3 December 1960, the first Atlas E missile arrived at the 567th SMS. Construction continued and SAC accepted the first Series E Atlas complex on 29 July 1961. Operational readiness training, which previously had been conducted only at Vandenberg AFB, California, began at Fairchild during the following month. On 28 September 1961, Headquarters SAC declared the squadron operational and during the following month, the 567th placed the first Atlas E missile on alert status. The bulk of the Fairchild force was on alert status in November.

As a result of Defense Secretary Robert McNamara's May 1964 directive accelerating the phaseout of Atlas and Titan I ICBMs, the first Atlas missiles came off line at Fairchild in January 1965. On 31 March, the last missile came off alert status, which marked the completion of Atlas phaseout. The squadron was inactivated within three months.

Today all of the former missile sites still exist and most appear to be in good condition. Most of them are in agricultural areas and presumably are being used to support farmers by storage of equipment and other material. Site "1" and "2" appear to be redeveloped into light industrial estates; "4" and "6" appear to be converted into private residences.

== Incidents ==
=== 1994 shooting ===
On 20 June 1994, 20-year-old Dean Mellberg, an ex-Air Force member, entered the base hospital and shot and killed four people and wounded 22 others.

Previously, psychologists Major Thomas Brigham and Captain Alan London at Fairchild AFB had found him unfit for duty, which resulted in a transfer to the Wilford Hall Medical Center at Lackland AFB for further psychological examination. With Congressional pressure brought by Mellberg's mother, Airman Mellberg was found to be fit for military service. Airman Mellberg then was reassigned to Cannon Air Force Base where similar events led to him being returned to psychologists for evaluation. After this evaluation, he was discharged from Cannon AFB as being unfit for military service; he had been diagnosed with mild autism, generalized anxiety disorder and paranoid personality disorder.

Mellberg traveled to Spokane, Washington, near Fairchild AFB, where he purchased a rifle and planned his attack on the base. At the time of the shooting, Fairchild's hospital was an ungated facility. Mellberg took a cab to the base with a large duffle bag and foam gun case, four weeks to the day following his discharge. The gunman, armed with a Chinese-made MAK-90, an AK-47 clone, and a 75-round drum magazine, entered the office of Brigham and London and killed both men. Mellberg continued to move through the hospital, injuring several people, and killing eight-year-old Christin McCarron. The gunman then walked out of the building into the parking lot and killed Anita Lindner. He then was confronted by a security policeman, Senior Airman Andy Brown. From approximately 70 yards away, Brown ordered Mellberg to drop his weapon. After Mellberg refused, Brown fired four shots from his 9mm pistol, with two rounds hitting the perpetrator in the head and shoulder, killing him.

A pregnant woman shot in the stomach also subsequently lost her unborn child. After an investigation it was concluded that Airman Brown was justified in his actions, probably having saved lives, and he was awarded the Airman's Medal by President Bill Clinton. In 2016, Brown published Warnings Unheeded: Twin Tragedies at Fairchild Air Force Base. The book reveals the pre-incident indicators of the shooting and the fatal crash of a B-52 bomber that occurred four days afterward.

Dean's concerning behavior was long recognized prior to his dismissal from the military. During basic training, in three different psychological examinations it was noted that he should be discharged. However, he was allowed to complete his basic training and earn his uniform. After a short time in the hospital, he was deemed fit to return and requested a transfer. After his transfer, he was discharged within two months due to symptoms of his personality disorder. Psychologists after the shooting speculate that the removal of his uniform at dismissal may have been a triggering factor to his rampage.

=== 1994 plane crash ===
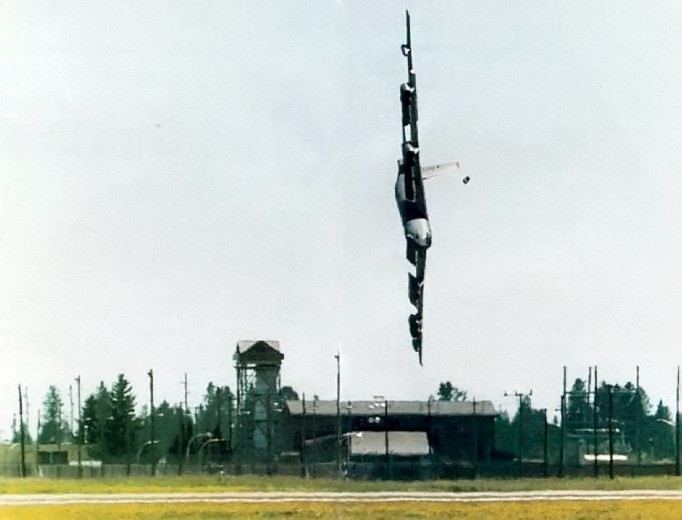
The B-52H perpendicular to the ground seconds before crashing

On 24 June 1994, just four days after the base hospital shooting, one of the few remaining B-52H bombers at Fairchild crashed during a practice flight for an upcoming air show, killing all four crew members. Pilot error as a result of reckless flying by U.S. Air Force Colonel Arthur "Bud" Holland was determined to be the cause of the crash.

== Role and operations ==
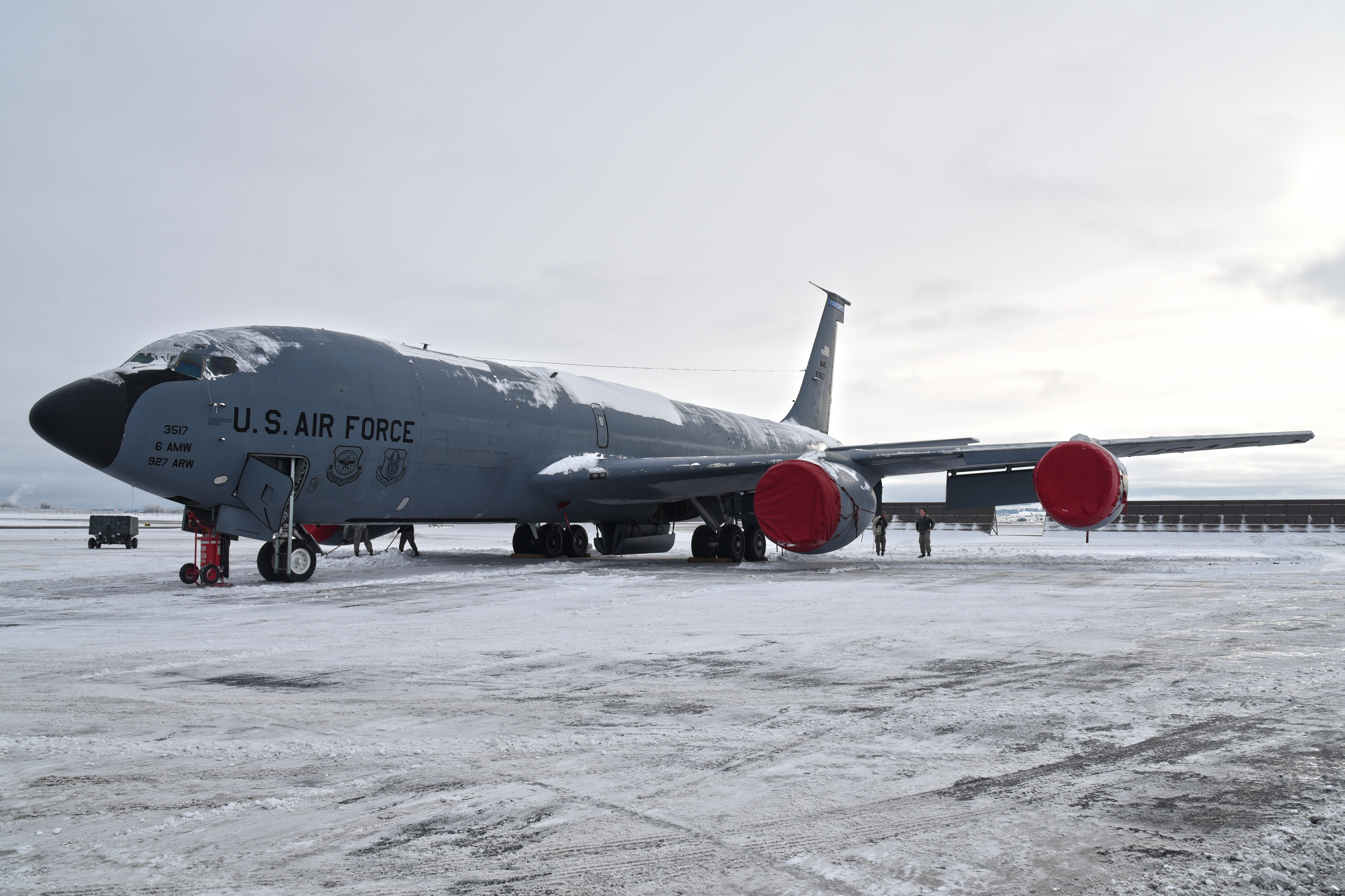
A KC-135R Stratotanker of the 6th Air Refueling Wing on the flight-line at Fairchild AFB during December 2016

Fairchild is home to a wide variety of units and missions. Most prominent is its air refueling mission, with two wings, one active, the 92nd Air Refueling Wing, and one national guard, the 141st Air Refueling Wing, both flying the Boeing KC-135 Stratotanker. The 92nd Air Refueling Wing comprises the 92nd Operations Group which provides air mobility for America through air refueling, airlift, and operational support, the 92d Maintenance Group which provides maintenance support to aircraft and equipment, the 92nd Mission Support Group which provides the foundation for support and morale of Fairchild and the 92nd Medical Group.

As of July 2021, Fairchild was the USAF's largest KC-135 operating location, with 63 aircraft assigned.

Other units here include the Air Force Survival, Evasion, Resistance and Escape school, medical detachments, a weapons squadron and the Joint Personnel Recovery Agency.

Over 5,200 active duty Air Force, Air National Guard, and tenant organization military and civilian employees work on Fairchild, making the base the largest employer in Eastern Washington. Fairchild's annual economic impact on the Spokane community is approximately $427 million, constituting 13 percent of the local economy.

== Based units ==
Flying and notable non-flying units based at Fairchild Air Force Base.

Units marked GSU are Geographically Separate Units, which although based at Fairchild, are subordinate to a parent unit based at another location.

=== United States Air Force ===
Air Mobility Command (AMC)

- Eighteenth Air Force
  - 92nd Air Refueling Wing
    - 92nd Operations Group
      - 92nd Air Refueling Squadron – KC-135R/T Stratotanker
      - 93rd Air Refueling Squadron – KC-135R/T Stratotanker
      - 97th Air Refueling Squadron – KC-135R Stratotanker
      - 384th Air Refueling Squadron – KC-135R Stratotanker
      - 92nd Operations Support Squadron
    - 92nd Maintenance Group
      - 92nd Aircraft Maintenance Squadron
      - 92nd Maintenance Operations Squadron
      - 92nd Maintenance Squadron
    - 92nd Medical Group
      - 92nd Aerospace Medicine Squadron
      - 92nd Medical Operations Squadron
      - 92nd Medical Support Squadron
    - 92nd Mission Support Group
      - 92nd Civil Engineer Squadron
      - 92nd Communications Squadron
      - 92nd Contracting Squadron
      - 92nd Force Support Squadron
      - 92nd Logistics Readiness Squadron
      - 92nd Security Forces Squadron

Air Education and Training Command (AETC)

- Nineteenth Air Force
  - 58th Special Operations Wing
    - 58th Special Operations Group
      - 36th Rescue Squadron (GSU) – UH-1N Iroquois
    - 336th Training Group
      - USAF Survival, Evasion, Resistance and Escape (SERE) School
      - 22nd Training Squadron
      - 66th Training Squadron
      - 336th Training Support Squadron

Air Combat Command (ACC)

- US Air Force Warfare Center
  - 57th Wing
    - USAF Weapons School
      - 509th Weapons Squadron (GSU) – KC-135R Stratotanker

Air National Guard (ANG)

- Washington Air National Guard
  - 141st Air Refueling Wing
    - 141st Operations Group
      - 116th Air Refueling Squadron – KC-135R Stratotanker
      - 141st Operations Support Squadron
    - 141st Maintenance Group
      - 141st Maintenance Operations Flight
      - 141st Maintenance Squadron
      - 141st Aircraft Maintenance Squadron
    - 141st Medical Group
    - 141st Mission Support Group
      - 141st Communications Flight
      - 141st Civil Engineer Squadron
      - 141st Force Support Squadron
      - 141st Logistics Readiness Squadron
      - 141st Security Forces Squadron
    - 560th Air Force Band

=== Department of Defense ===
Joint Chiefs of Staff (JCS)

- Joint Personnel Recovery Agency

== Weaponry ==
At one time in the early 1990s, Washington state had the distinction of having more nuclear warheads than four of the six known nuclear-armed nations. These warheads were concentrated in two places: at Fairchild AFB and at the Kitsap submarine base across Puget Sound, on the Hood Canal. At Fairchild, 85 nuclear gravity bombs (25 B61-7 gravity bombs and 60 B83 gravity bombs) were stored in a reserve nuclear depot. Naval Base Kitsap's eight Ohio-class submarines, carrying up to 24 of the now-decommissioned UGM-96 Trident I missiles per boat, each capable of carrying up to eight warheads per missile, for a total of 1,536. The gravity bombs were removed from the base by the end of the 1990s.

== Geography ==
According to the United States Census Bureau, the census-designated place (CDP) has a total area of 6.5 square miles (16.8 km^{2}), all of it land. Spokane International Airport is located just four miles to the east.

== Demographics ==
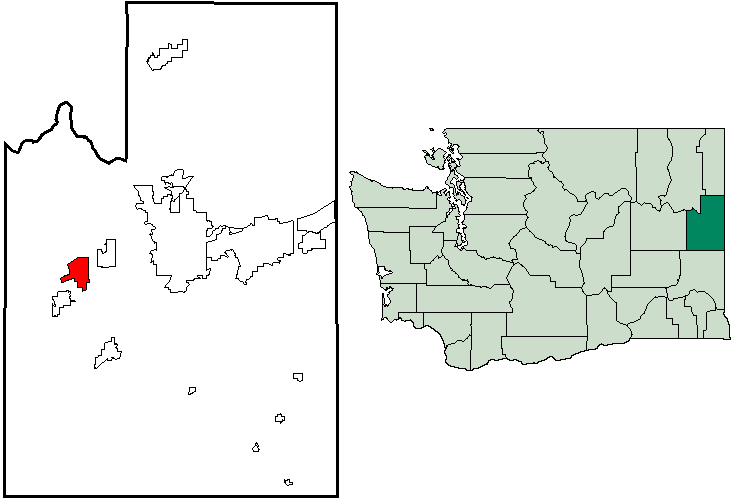
Location of Fairchild AFB, Washington

Historical population
Census	Pop.	Note	%±
1970	6,754		—
1980	5,353		−20.7%
1990	4,854		−9.3%
2000	4,357		−10.2%
2010	2,776		−36.3%
2020	2,695		−2.9%
U.S. Decennial Census; 1960 1970 1980 1990; 2000 2010

Fairchild AFB first appeared as unincorporated place under the name Fairchild in the 1970 U.S. census; and as a census designated place under the name Fairchild AFB in the 1980 U.S. census.

=== 2000 census ===
As of the census of 2010, there were 2,736 people. At the 2000 census there were, 1,071 households, and 1,048 families residing in the CDP. The population density was 670.2 people per square mile (258.8/km^{2}). There were 1,114 housing units at an average density of 171.3/sq mi (66.2/km^{2}). The racial makeup of the CDP was 78.20% White, 7.90% African American, 0.53% Native American, 3.56% Asian, 0.37% Pacific Islander, 3.79% from other races, and 5.67% from two or more races. Hispanic or Latino of any race were 8.52% of the population.

There were 1,071 households, out of which 72.5% had children under the age of 18 living with them, 90.8% were married couples living together, 4.4% had a female householder with no husband present, and 2.1% were non-families. 1.9% of all households were made up of individuals, and none had someone living alone who was 65 years of age or older. The average household size was 3.36 and the average family size was 3.39.

In the CDP, the population was spread out, with 34.1% under the age of 18, 24.9% from 18 to 24, 38.3% from 25 to 44, 2.1% from 45 to 64, and 0.6% who were 65 years of age or older. The median age was 23 years. For every 100 females, there were 127.9 males. For every 100 females age 18 and over, there were 135.7 males.

The median income for a household in the CDP was $33,512, and the median income for a family was $33,398. Males had a median income of $22,299 versus $15,815 for females. The per capita income for the CDP was $11,961. About 4.8% of families and 5.0% of the population were below the poverty line, including 6.4% of those under age 18 and none of those age 65 or over.

== Public schools ==
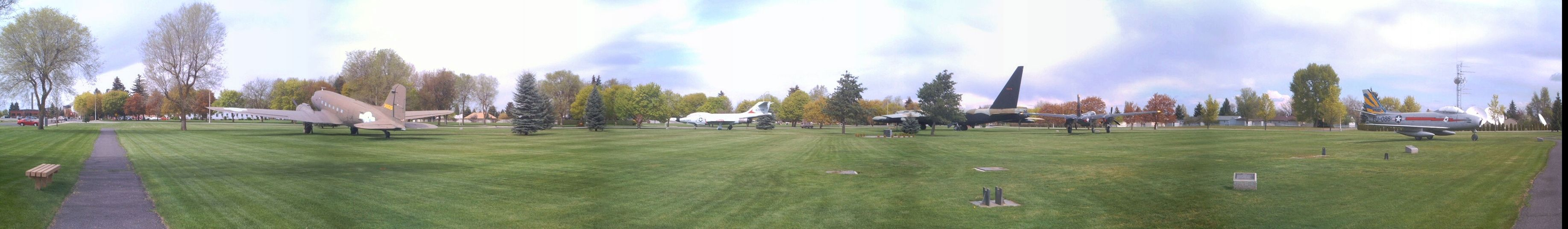
Heritage Park Aircraft Display

The base housing area at Fairchild is within the Medical Lake School District (#326). An elementary school (K-5) is on base, renamed for Space Shuttle astronaut Michael Anderson. Students in middle school (6–8) and high school (9–12) attend classes in the city of Medical Lake, a few miles to the south. Significantly smaller than the public high schools in Spokane, Medical Lake High School competes in WIAA Class 1A in athletics in the Northeast 'A' League (NEA).

== See also ==
- List of United States Air Force installations
- Washington World War II Army Airfields

== Other sources ==
- Maurer, Maurer. Air Force Combat Units of World War II. Washington, DC: U.S. Government Printing Office 1961 (republished 1983, Office of Air Force History, ISBN 0-912799-02-1).
- Ravenstein, Charles A. Air Force Combat Wings Lineage and Honors Histories 1947–1977. Maxwell Air Force Base, Alabama: Office of Air Force History 1984. ISBN 0-912799-12-9.
- Mueller, Robert, Air Force Bases Volume I, Active Air Force Bases Within the United States of America on 17 September 1982, Office of Air Force History, 1989
