= Muir S. Fairchild =

US Air Force general (1894–1950)

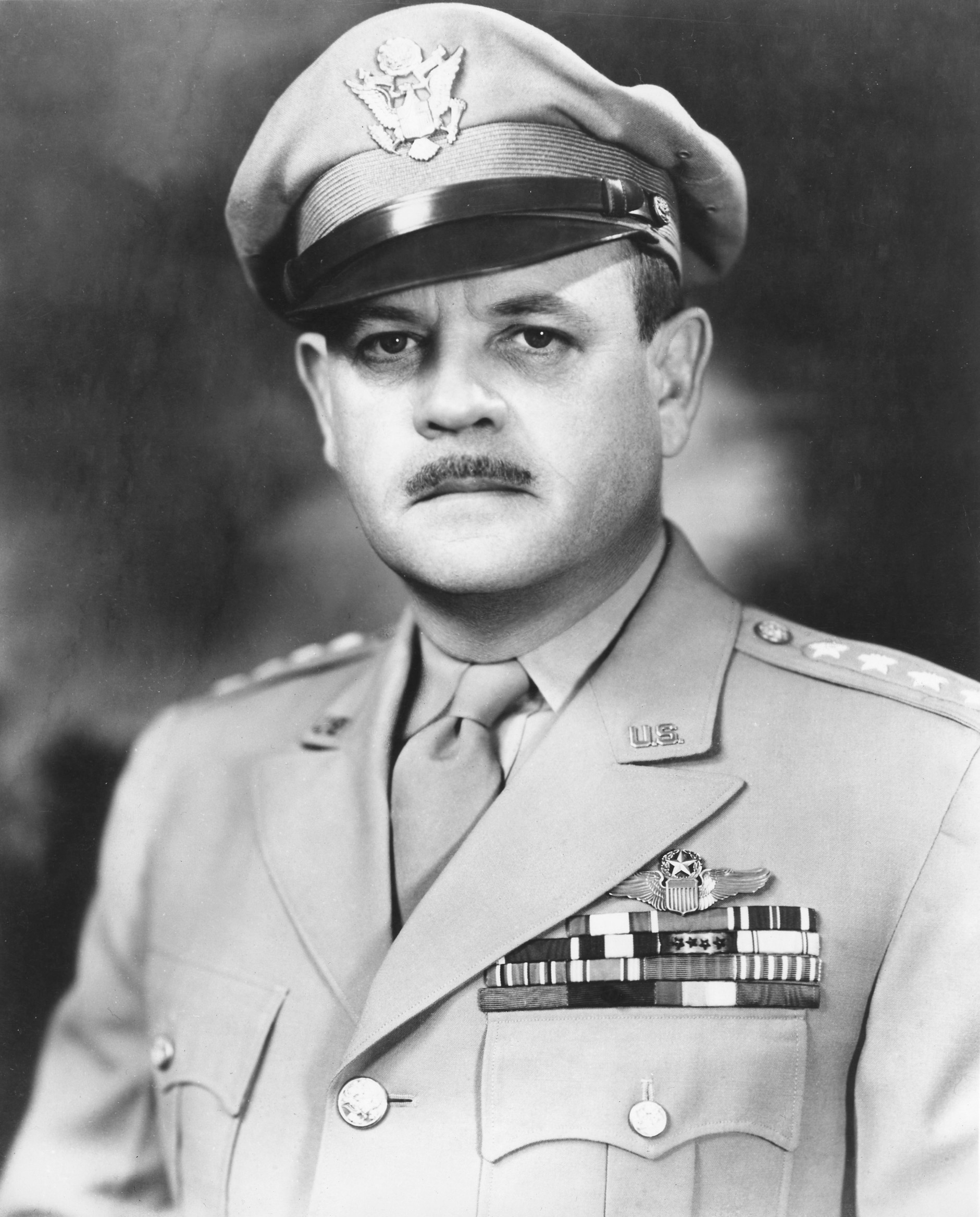
- General Muir Stephen Fairchild
- Born: September 2, 1894; Bellingham, Washington, US
- Died: March 17, 1950 (aged 55); Fort Myer, Virginia, US
- Burial place: Arlington National Cemetery; Arlington, Virginia; Section 34, Plot 48-A
- Spouse(s): Florence Alice (Rossiter) Fairchild (1898–1989)
- Military career
- Allegiance: United States
- Branch: United States Army; United States Air Force
- Service years: 1913–1947 (Army); 1947–1950 (Air Force)
- Rank: General
- Commands: Vice Chief of Staff, USAF; Commandant, Air University
- Conflicts: Mexican Expedition; World War I World War II
- Awards: Distinguished Service Medal (2); Legion of Merit; Distinguished Flying Cross

General Muir Stephen Fairchild (September 2, 1894 – March 17, 1950) was a United States Air Force officer and the service's second Vice Chief of Staff.

== Early service ==
Born in Bellingham, Washington, Fairchild moved to Olympia in 1905 when his father was appointed by Governor Meade as chairman of Washington's first Railroad Commission. Muir graduated from Olympia High School (officially William Winlock Miller High School) in 1913, then entered the U.S. Army's Signal Corps in 1913 in an Army Signal Corps reserve unit in Seattle, while he was a student at the University of Washington. In 1916, he was deployed in the Washington National Guard with the rank of sergeant, and his unit joined in the search for Pancho Villa along the Mexican border, where he spent much time in a horse saddle in the desert heat. Watching observation planes flying overhead in the United States' first armed conflict using airplanes, Fairchild was an easy recruit when flyboys were being sought to fight with the French and Italians in the developing war in Europe, before the U.S. entered World War I. A year later Fairchild became a flying cadet at Berkeley, California, getting his wings and commission in the U.S. Army's Aviation Section in January 1918. Fairchild fought the Germans from the air over the Rhine, including night bombing missions, in an era when bombs were still being released from the hand grasp of the bombardier.

== Between the wars ==
In December 1918 Fairchild returned home and served at McCook Field, Ohio; Mitchel Field, New York, and Langley Field, Virginia. On October 20, 1922 he was practicing dog fighting with Lt. Harold Ross Harris; when Harris lost control of his aircraft and was forced to parachute his way to safety; ironically nearly a year later August 22, 1923 both Harris and Fairchild piloted the US Military first heavy bomber the Witteman-Lewis XNBL-1.

In 1926 and 1927, he flew to South America as part of the Pan American Good Will Flight a 22,000-mile (35,000 km) pioneering flight that sought to promote air postal service, U.S. commercial aviation and take messages of friendship to the governments and people of Central and South America, while forging aerial navigation routes through the Americas. The flight originated with five aircraft and crews taking off from Kelly Field, Texas on December 21, 1926, seeking to land in 23 Central and South American countries.

The aircraft used for the journey were new observation planes, the Loening OA-1A that could be used as both landplanes and seaplanes, with Liberty engines and a wood interior structure with an aluminum-covered fuselage and fabric-covered wings. Each plane was named for a U.S. city and crewed by two pilots, one of whom was an engineering officer, since there were very few airfields or repair facilities along the route, with the crew choosing the motto "No Work, No Ride."

Crew of the New York: Maj. Herbert Dargue, Lt. Ennis Whitehead; Crew of the San Antonio: Capt. Arthur McDaniel, Lt. Charles Robinson; Crew of the San Francisco: Capt. Ira Eaker, Lt. Muir Fairchild; Crew of the Detroit: Capt. Clinton F. Woolsey, Lt. John Benton; Crew of the St. Louis: Lt. Bernard Thompson, Lt. Leonard Weddington

The flight was marred by tragedy when the Detroit and New York accidentally collided mid-air and got locked together. The crew of the New York were able to parachute to safety but Capt. Woolsley and Lt. Benton were killed when the Detroit hit the ground.

The Pan American Flyers were greeted by a cheering crowd including President Calvin Coolidge, Cabinet members, and diplomats from Central and Latin America when they returned to Bolling Field, Washington, D.C., on May 2, 1927.

Fairchild and the rest of the surviving Pan American Flight crew, and Charles Lindbergh, were among the first nine aviators to receive the newly created award Distinguished Flying Cross. The Pan Am Good Will Tour aviators were the first to be named to receive the Distinguished Flying Cross, Lindbergh's being named came after the Pan Am Good Will Tour members, though Lindbergh actually received his medal first.

Fairchild went on to complete the course in the Air Corps Engineer School at Wright Field in June 1929 and went to Santa Monica, California, as Air Corps representative to Douglas Aircraft Corporation. In June 1935 he graduated from the Air Corps Tactical School, along with strategic bombing advocates Haywood S. Hansell, Barney Giles, Vernon M. Guymon, Laurence S. Kuter, Lawson H. M. Sanderson and Hoyt S. Vandenberg, then became an Air Corps Tactical School instructor. He later attended the Army Industrial College, and the Army War College. He rose to director of air tactics and strategy in 1939.

== Second World War ==
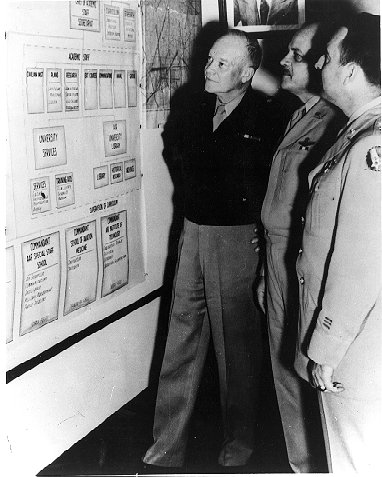
From left, Gen Dwight Eisenhower, Army Chief of Staff; Maj Gen Muir Fairchild, AU commander; and Maj Gen David Schlatter, the AU deputy commanding general (education), review an AU organizational chart during General Eisenhower's visit to Maxwell on 9 April 1947.

In 1940, Fairchild went to the Plans Division in Washington and in 1941 was named secretary of the newly formed Air Staff. Two months later he was advanced two grades to brigadier general and named assistant chief of Air Corps. In 1942 he became director of military requirements and was promoted to major general in August. In November he became a member of the Joint Strategic Survey Committee of the Joint Chiefs of Staff.

== Post war ==
On 20 December 1945, Fairchild was named commandant of the Army Air Forces School at Maxwell Field in Alabama,. The Army Air Forces School was renamed Air University on 15 March 1946.

On May 27, 1948, he became the second vice chief of staff of the U.S. Air Force, with the rank of general. (This made General Fairchild the only officer in the history of the Air Force to be promoted to the rank of general without having served as a lieutenant general first.) Only one year and ten months later, General Fairchild died of a heart attack at his quarters at Fort Myer on March 17, 1950, while still on active duty as vice chief of staff at the Pentagon. He was survived by his wife, Florence Alice Fairchild, and his daughter, Betsy Anne Calvert.

== Legacy ==
Fairchild Hall, the main academic building at the United States Air Force Academy in Colorado, and the library at the Air University in Alabama, Fairchild Memorial Hall, were named for him. In his home state of Washington, Fairchild Air Force Base near Spokane was named for him shortly after his death. He is buried at Arlington National Cemetery.

== Promotions ==
Fairchild's overlapping Army commissions in the 1940s resulted in him effectively skipping over the grades of colonel and lieutenant general.

- Enlisted, Washington National Guard - 19 June 1916
- Enlisted, Regular Army - 6 June 1917
- 2nd Lieutenant, Officers Reserve Corps - 11 January 1918
- 1st Lieutenant, Officers Reserve Corps - 8 March 1918
- Discharged - 31 October 1919
- 1st Lieutenant, Army Air Service - 1 July 1920
- Captain, Army Air Service - 15 January 1931
- Major (temporary) - 16 June 1936
- Major, Regular Army - 12 June 1939
- Lieutenant-Colonel (temporary) 16 November 1940
- Brigadier-General (Army of the United States) - 4 August 1941
- Lieutenant-Colonel, Regular Army - 15 October 1941
- Colonel (Temporary) - 5 February 1942
- Major-General (Army of the United States) - 3 August 1942
- Brigadier-General, Regular Army - 18 July 1946
- Major General (United States Air Force) - 10 September 1947 (Date of rank - 12 July 1942.)
- General (Air Force of the United States) - 27 May 1948

Military offices
Preceded by Hoyt S. Vandenberg	Vice Chief of Staff of the United States Air Force; 1948–1950	Succeeded by Nathan F. Twining
