= Wedge Mountain (Washington) =

Mountain in Washington (state), United States

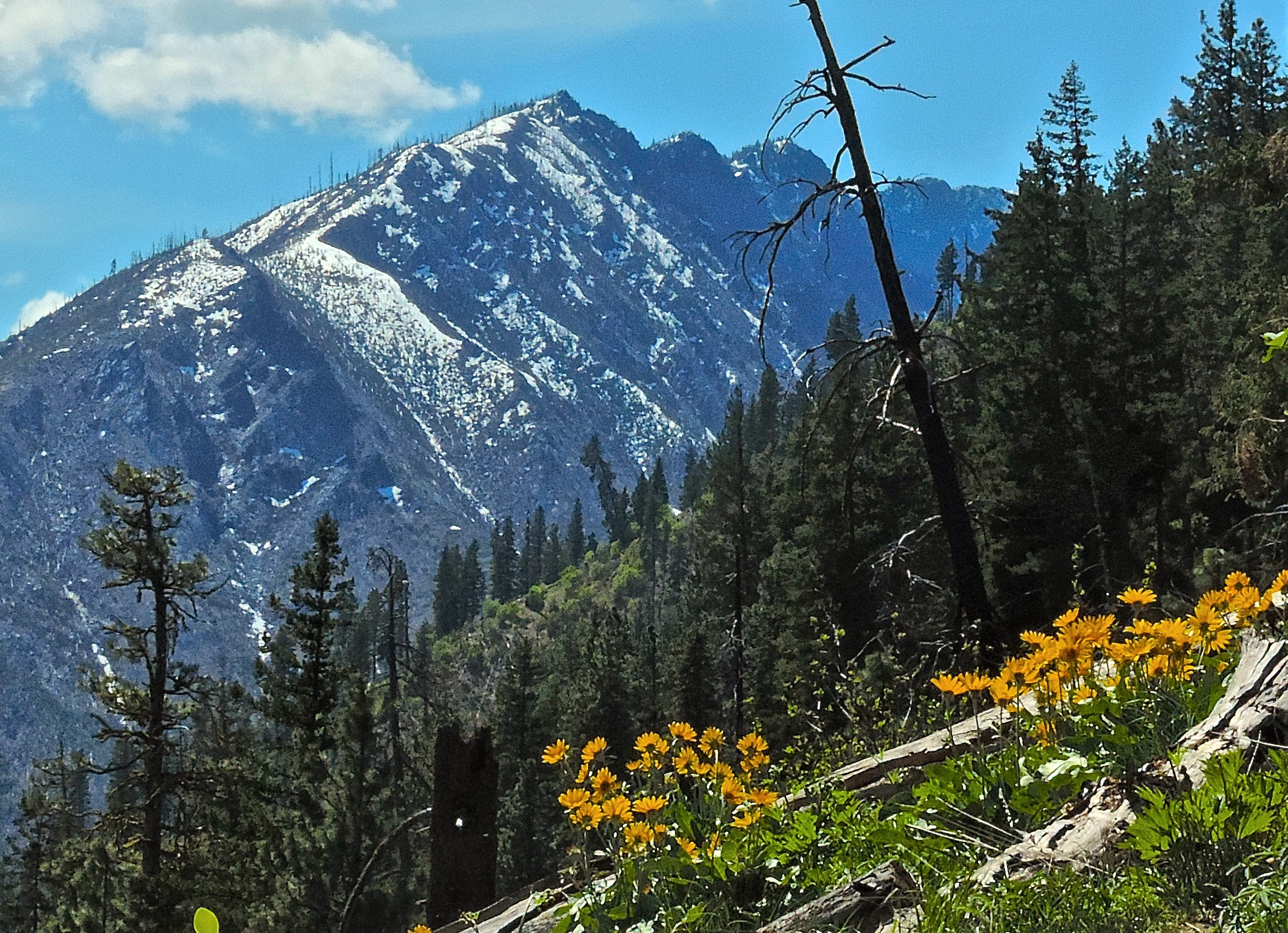
- North aspect

Highest point
- Elevation: 5,860 ft (1,786 m)
- Prominence: 160 ft (49 m)
- Parent peak: Three Musketeers Ridge
- Isolation: 2.35 mi (3.78 km)
- Coordinates: 47°30′57″N 120°42′24″W

Geography
- Location within Washington (state) Location within the United States
- Country: United States
- State: Washington
- County: Chelan
- Protected area: Alpine Lakes Wilderness
- Parent range: Stuart Range; Wenatchee Mountains; Cascade Range
- Topo map: USGS Leavenworth

Geology
- Rock type: granite

Climbing
- Easiest route: scrambling

Wedge Mountain is a 5,860-foot-elevation (1,790-meter) summit located in Chelan County of Washington state. It is set on the boundary line of the Alpine Lakes Wilderness, on land managed by Okanogan-Wenatchee National Forest. Wedge Mountain is the northeastern terminus of the Stuart Range, which is a subset of the Cascade Range. It is situated 3.5 miles (5.6 km) northeast of The Temple, and the nearest town is Leavenworth, 5 miles (8.0 km) to the north-northeast. Precipitation runoff from the mountain drains into tributaries of the Wenatchee River. Topographic relief is significant as the summit rises over 2,800 feet (850 meters) above Snow Creek in one-half mile. Backpackers hiking en route to The Enchantments via the Snow Creek Trail traverse the western foot of this mountain. Wedge Mountain is the toponym officially adopted by the U.S. Board on Geographic Names for the 5,860-foot summit.

== Peak 6885 ==
Mountain climbers and Fred Beckey in his Cascade Alpine Guide refer to Peak 6885 as Wedge Mountain. It is located two miles south-southwest of the official Wedge Mountain summit along McClellan Ridge, and is also known as "South Wedge Mountain." The east face of this peak has three established climbing routes, two of which were first climbed by Jim Yoder and Pete Austin in 1983, and the third route was done in January 1984 by Jim Yoder and Kevin Buselmeier as a winter ascent.

== Climate ==
Weather fronts originating in the Pacific Ocean travel east toward the Cascade Mountains. As fronts approach, they are forced upward by the peaks of the Cascade Range (Orographic lift), causing them to drop their moisture in the form of rain or snowfall onto the Cascades. As a result, the Cascades experience high precipitation, especially during the winter months in the form of snowfall. During winter months, weather is usually cloudy, but, due to high pressure systems over the Pacific Ocean that intensify during summer months, there is often little or no cloud cover during the summer.

== Geology ==
The Alpine Lakes Wilderness features some of the most rugged topography in the Cascade Range with craggy peaks and ridges, deep glacial valleys, and granite walls spotted with over 700 mountain lakes. Geological events occurring many years ago created the diverse topography and drastic elevation changes over the Cascade Range leading to the various climate differences.

The history of the formation of the Cascade Mountains dates back millions of years ago to the late Eocene Epoch. With the North American Plate overriding the Pacific Plate, episodes of volcanic igneous activity persisted. In addition, small fragments of the oceanic and continental lithosphere called terranes created the North Cascades about 50 million years ago.

During the Pleistocene period dating back over two million years ago, glaciation advancing and retreating repeatedly scoured the landscape leaving deposits of rock debris. The last glacial retreat in the Alpine Lakes area began about 14,000 years ago and was north of the Canada–US border by 10,000 years ago. The U-shaped cross section of the river valleys is a result of that recent glaciation. Uplift and faulting in combination with glaciation have been the dominant processes which have created the tall peaks and deep valleys of the Alpine Lakes Wilderness area.

== See also ==
- List of peaks of the Alpine Lakes Wilderness
- Geology of the Pacific Northwest

== Gallery ==
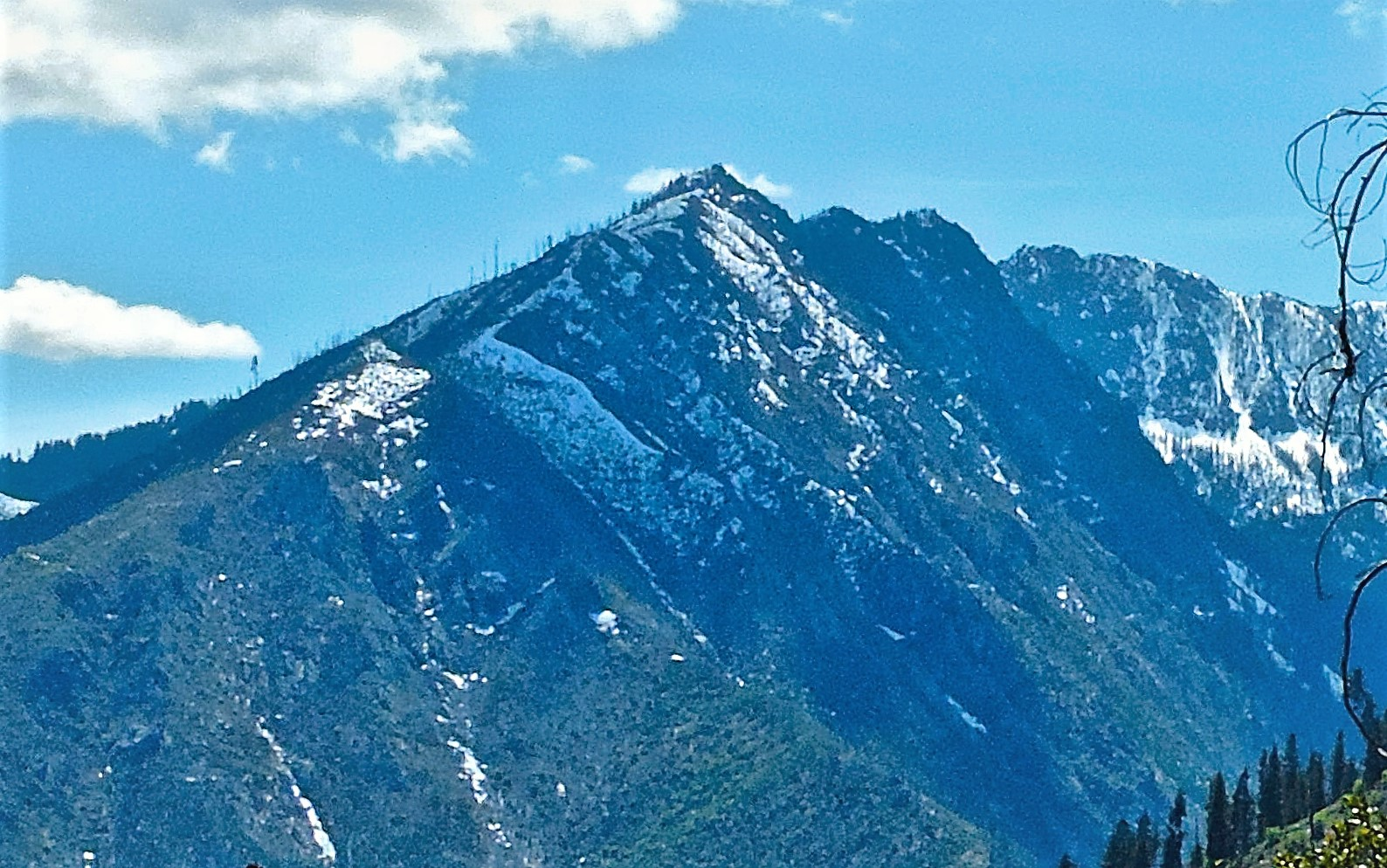
Wedge Mountain, with Peak 6885 seen to the right in back

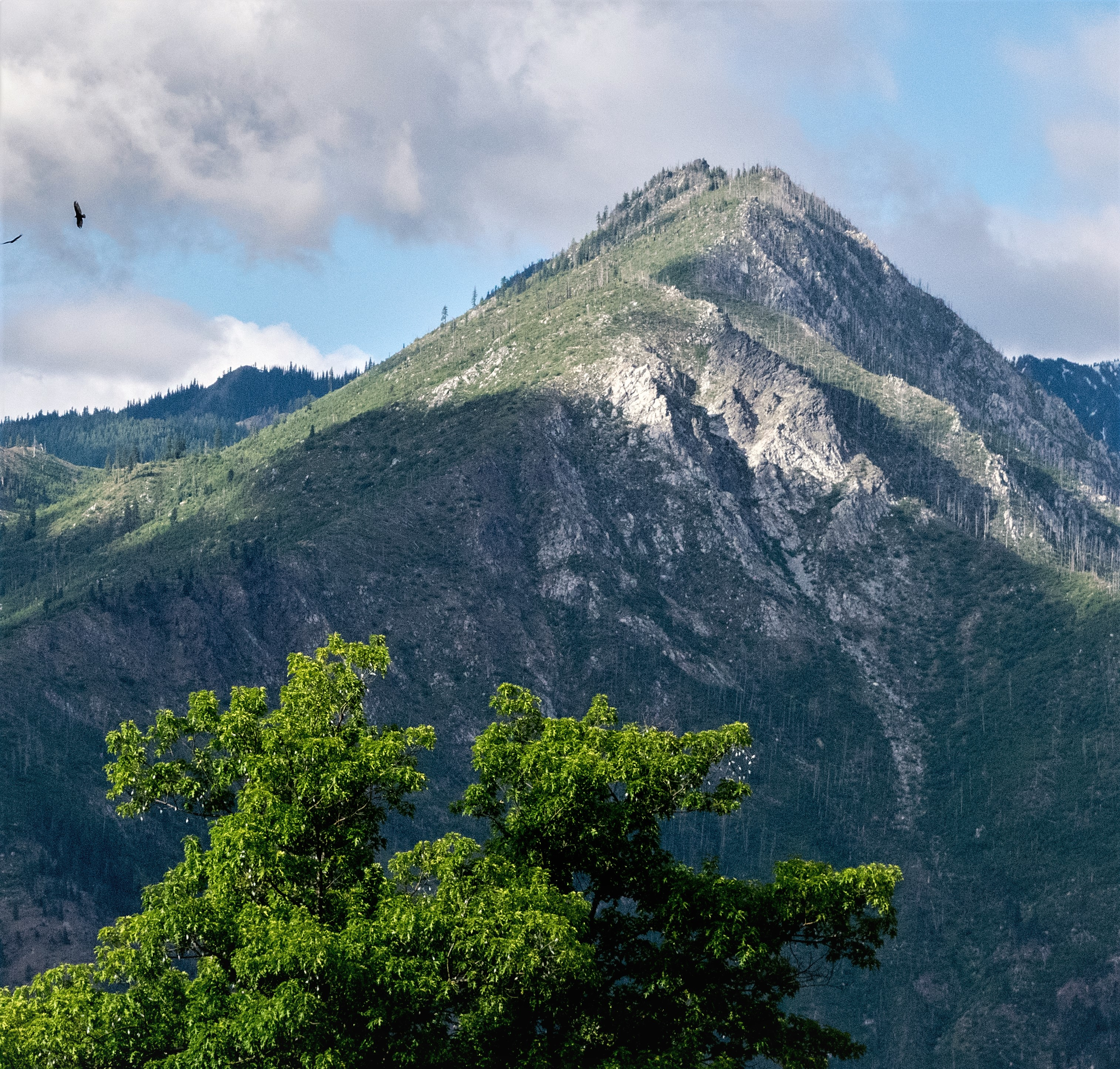
North slope of Wedge Mountain from Leavenworth
