= Edward Peak =

Mountain in Washington (state), United States

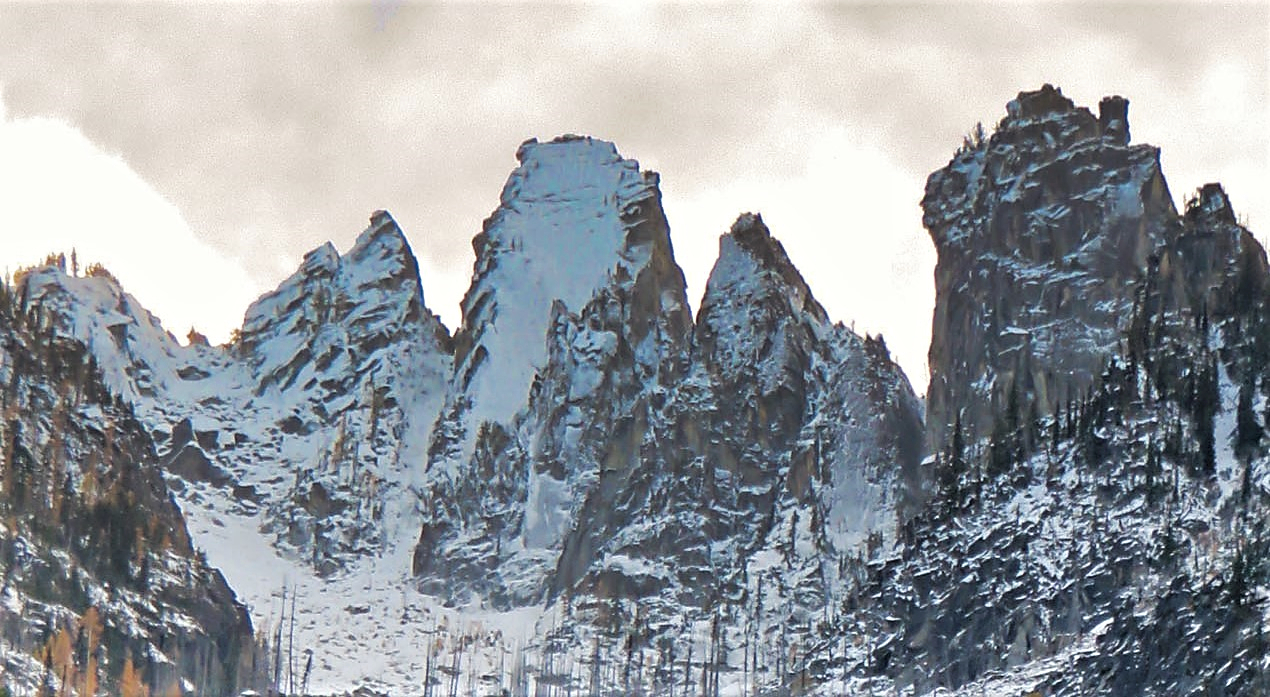
- Edward Peak centered, north aspect

Highest point
- Elevation: 7,280 ft (2,219 m)
- Prominence: 480 ft (150 m)
- Parent peak: Three Musketeers Ridge (7,700 ft)
- Isolation: 1.15 mi (1.85 km)
- Coordinates: 47°30′56″N 120°45′27″W

Geography
- Location within Washington (state) Location within the United States
- Location: Chelan County; Washington state, U.S.
- Parent range: Stuart Range; Wenatchee Mountains; Cascade Range
- Topo map: USGS Cashmere Mountain

Geology
- Rock age: Late Cretaceous
- Rock type: Tonalitic pluton

Climbing
- First ascent: 1948 by Fred Beckey
- Easiest route: class 5.7 Climbing

Edward Peak, also known as The Mole, is a 7,280-foot (2,219-metre) granite summit located in Chelan County of Washington state. It is set within the Alpine Lakes Wilderness, on land managed by Okanogan-Wenatchee National Forest. Edward Peak belongs to the Stuart Range which is a subset of the Cascade Range. It is situated 1.9 miles (3.1 km) north of The Temple, and the nearest town is Leavenworth, 7 miles (11 km) to the northeast. Precipitation runoff from the mountain drains north into Icicle Creek via Rat Creek.

== Climbing ==
The first ascent of the summit was made in May 1948 by Fred Beckey, Wesley Grande, and Ralph Widrig via the south face. This party named the peak "The Mole".

Other established climbing routes:

- West Face – 1957 – class 5.7 – Patrik Callis, James Fraser, Gerry Honey
- East Corner – 1957 – class 5.8 – Fred Beckey, Bob Lewis
- North Face – 1962 – class 5.7 – Don Gordon, Patrik Callis, Eric Bjornstad, Dan Davis
- Southwest Rib – 1980 – class 5.9 – Pete Doorish, Bob Crawford

== Climate ==
Most weather fronts originate in the Pacific Ocean, and travel east toward the Cascade Mountains. As fronts approach, they are forced upward by the peaks of the Cascade Range, causing them to drop their moisture in the form of rain or snowfall onto the Cascades (Orographic lift). As a result, the Cascades experience high precipitation, especially during the winter months in the form of snowfall. During winter months, weather is usually cloudy, but, due to high pressure systems over the Pacific Ocean that intensify during summer months, there is often little or no cloud cover during the summer.

== Geology ==
The Alpine Lakes Wilderness features some of the most rugged topography in the Cascade Range with craggy peaks and ridges, deep glacial valleys, and granite walls spotted with over 700 mountain lakes. Geological events occurring many years ago created the diverse topography and drastic elevation changes over the Cascade Range leading to the various climate differences.

The history of the formation of the Cascade Mountains dates back millions of years ago to the late Eocene Epoch. With the North American Plate overriding the Pacific Plate, episodes of volcanic igneous activity persisted. In addition, small fragments of the oceanic and continental lithosphere called terranes created the North Cascades about 50 million years ago.

During the Pleistocene period dating back over two million years ago, glaciation advancing and retreating repeatedly scoured the landscape leaving deposits of rock debris. The last glacial retreat in the Alpine Lakes area began about 14,000 years ago and was north of the Canada–US border by 10,000 years ago. The U-shaped cross section of the river valleys is a result of that recent glaciation. Uplift and faulting in combination with glaciation have been the dominant processes which have created the tall peaks and deep valleys of the Alpine Lakes Wilderness area.

== See also ==
- List of peaks of the Alpine Lakes Wilderness
- Geology of the Pacific Northwest

== Gallery ==
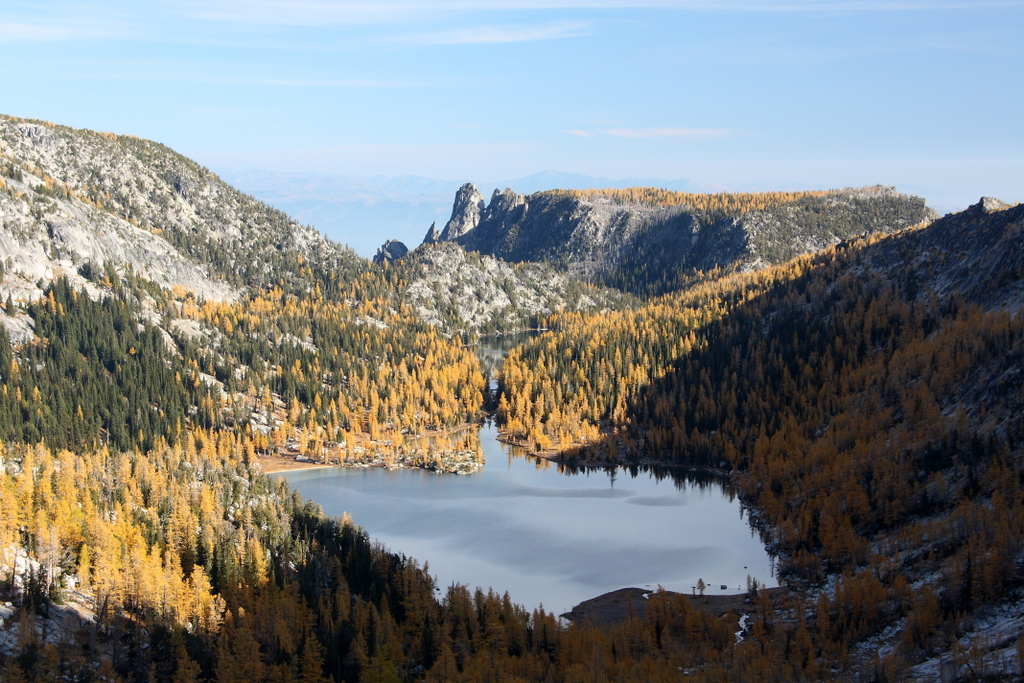
Edward Peak viewed from Prusik Pass

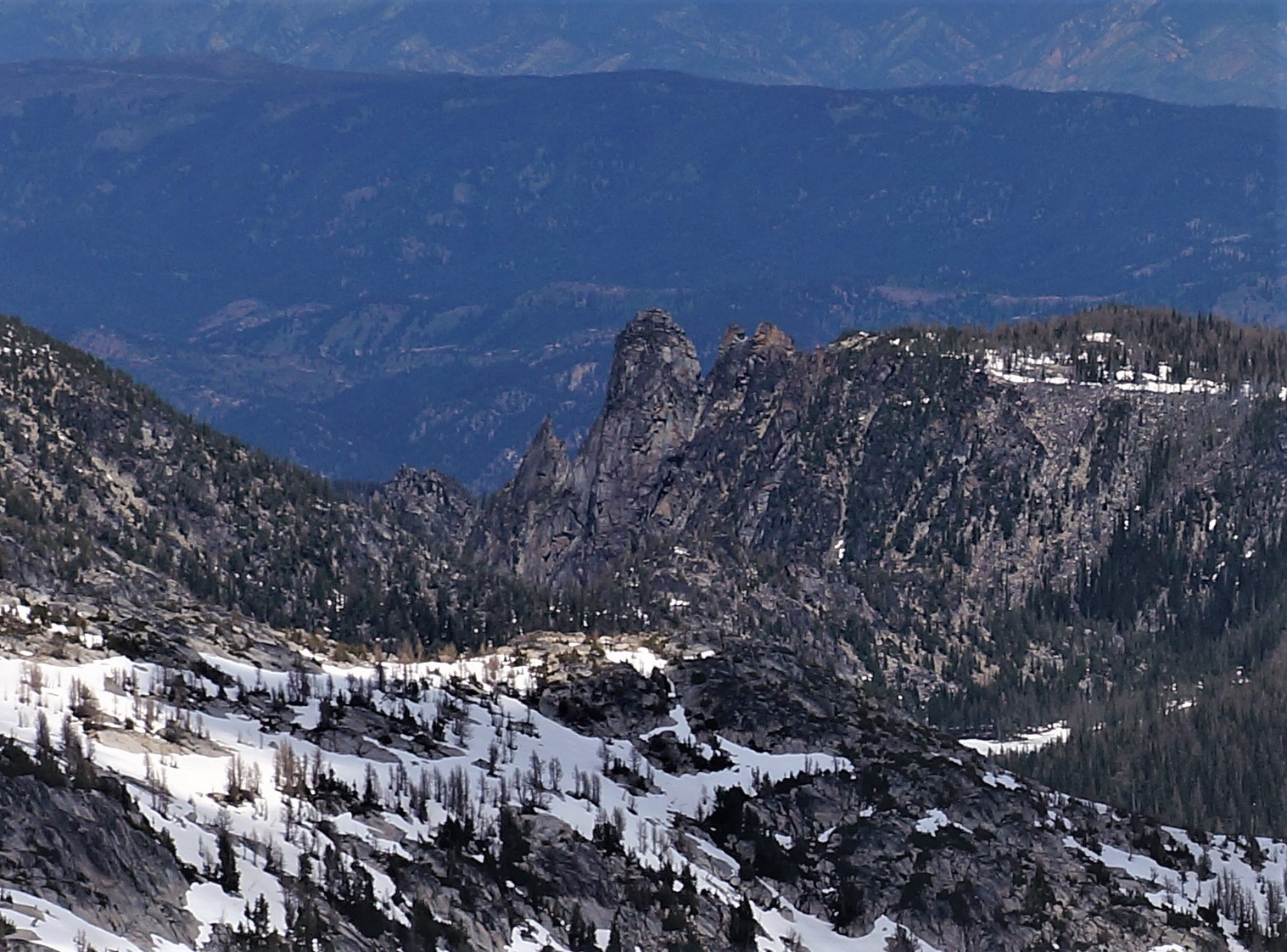
Southwest aspect, as seen from Little Annapurna

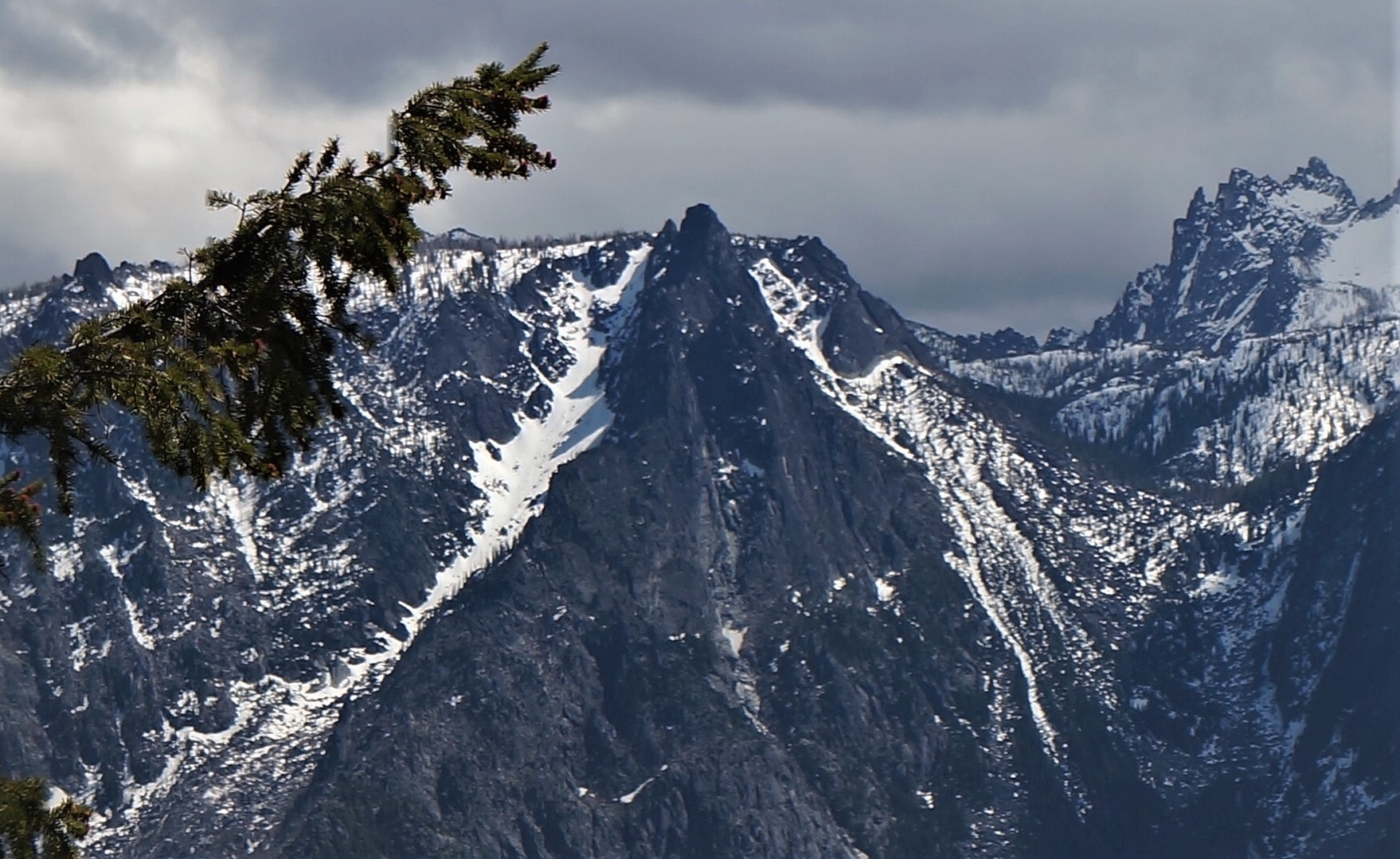
Edward Peak centered, from the north
