= Terrace Mountain (Washington) =

Mountain summit

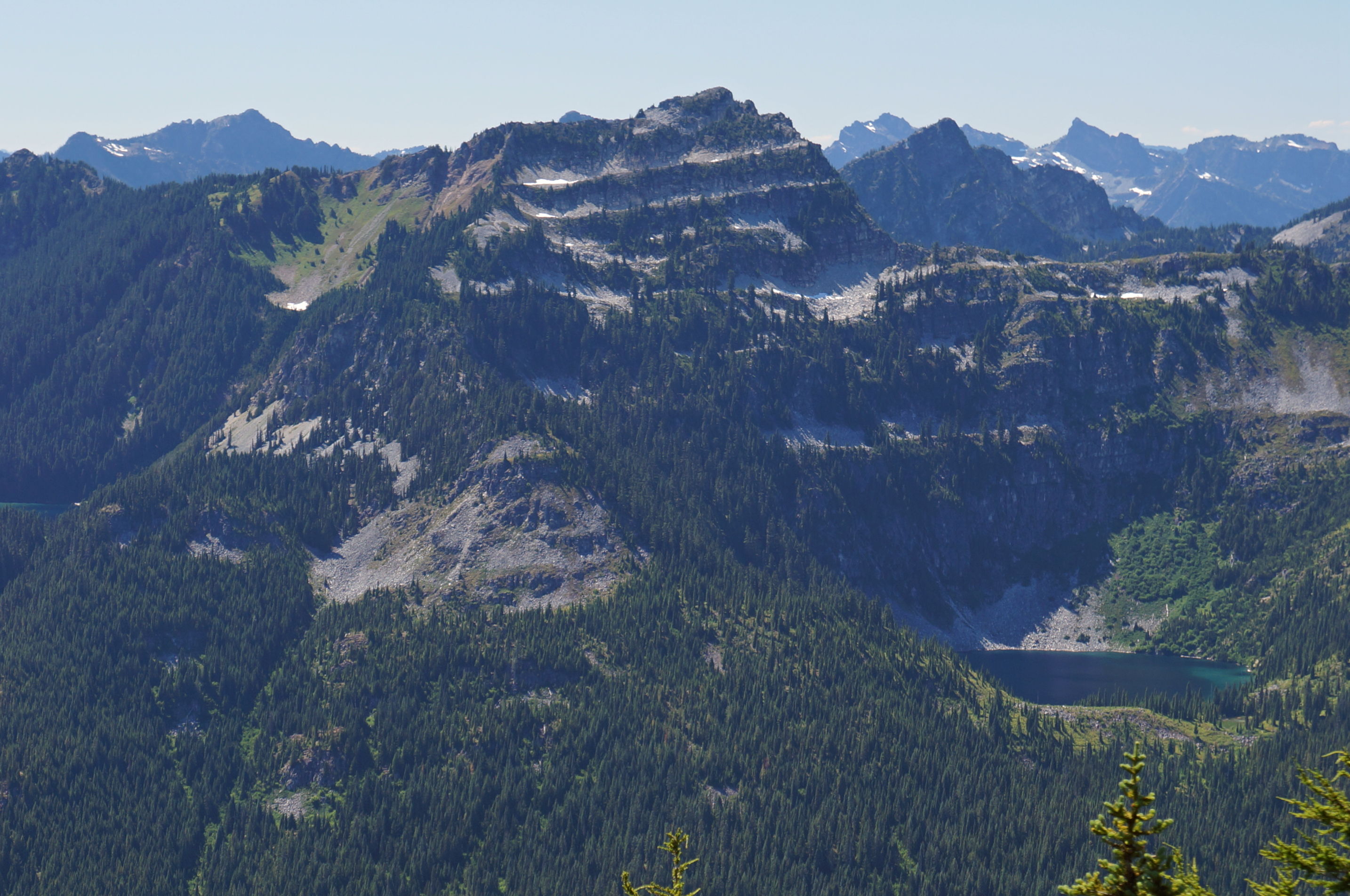
- Terrace Mountain from the east

Highest point
- Elevation: 6,361 ft (1,939 m)
- Prominence: 721 ft (220 m)
- Parent peak: Dip Top Peak (7,291 ft)
- Isolation: 2.77 mi (4.46 km)
- Coordinates: 47°37′18″N 121°11′51″W

Geography
- Location within Washington (state) Location within the United States
- Country: United States
- State: Washington
- County: King
- Protected area: Alpine Lakes Wilderness
- Parent range: Cascade Range
- Topo map: USGS Mount Daniel

Climbing
- Easiest route: Scrambling

Terrace Mountain is a 6,361-foot (1,939-metre) mountain summit located in the Alpine Lakes Wilderness in eastern King County of Washington state. It is part of the Cascade Range and is situated on land managed by Mount Baker-Snoqualmie National Forest. The peak is situated 4 mi (6.4 km) north of Mount Daniel, and is surrounded by Lake Clarice, Marmot Lake, Ptarmigan Lakes, and the Terrace Lakes. Precipitation runoff from the mountain drains into tributaries of the Skykomish River. Topographic relief is significant as the summit rises over 1,800 feet (550 meters) above Lake Clarice in less than one-half mile (0.8 km). The mountain's descriptive name stems from the terrace-like appearance created by a series of benches on its east aspect.

== Geology ==
The Alpine Lakes Wilderness features some of the most rugged topography in the Cascade Range with craggy peaks and ridges, deep glacial valleys, and granite walls spotted with over 700 mountain lakes. Geological events occurring many years ago created the diverse topography and drastic elevation changes over the Cascade Range leading to various climate differences.

The history of the formation of the Cascade Mountains dates back millions of years ago to the late Eocene Epoch. With the North American Plate overriding the Pacific Plate, episodes of volcanic igneous activity persisted. Glacier Peak, a stratovolcano that is 33.5 mi (53.9 km) north of Terrace Mountain, began forming in the mid-Pleistocene. During the Pleistocene period dating back over two million years ago, glaciation advancing and retreating repeatedly scoured and shaped the landscape. The last glacial retreat in the Alpine Lakes area began about 14,000 years ago and was north of the Canada–US border by 10,000 years ago. The U-shaped cross section of the river valleys is a result of that recent glaciation. Uplift and faulting in combination with glaciation have been the dominant processes which have created the tall peaks and deep valleys of the Alpine Lakes Wilderness area.

== Climate ==
Terrace Mountain is located in the marine west coast climate zone of western North America. Most weather fronts originating in the Pacific Ocean travel northeast toward the Cascade Mountains. As fronts approach, they are forced upward by the peaks of the Cascade Range (orographic lift), causing them to drop their moisture in the form of rain or snowfall onto the Cascades. As a result, the west side of the Cascades experiences high precipitation, especially during the winter months in the form of snowfall. Because of maritime influence, snow tends to be wet and heavy, resulting in high avalanche danger. During winter months, weather is usually cloudy, but, due to high pressure systems over the Pacific Ocean that intensify during summer months, there is often little or no cloud cover during the summer.

== Gallery ==
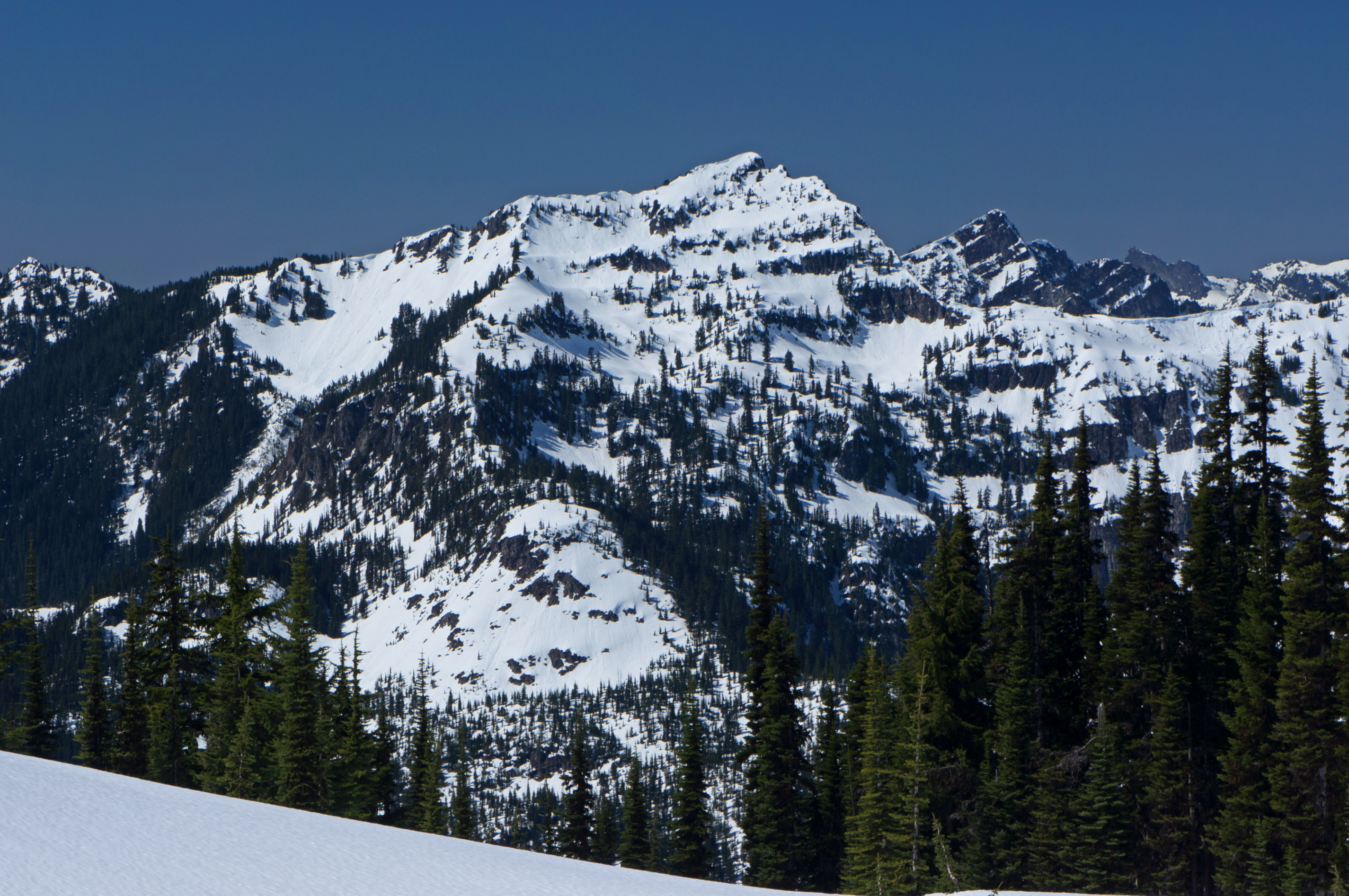
Terrace Mountain in early spring

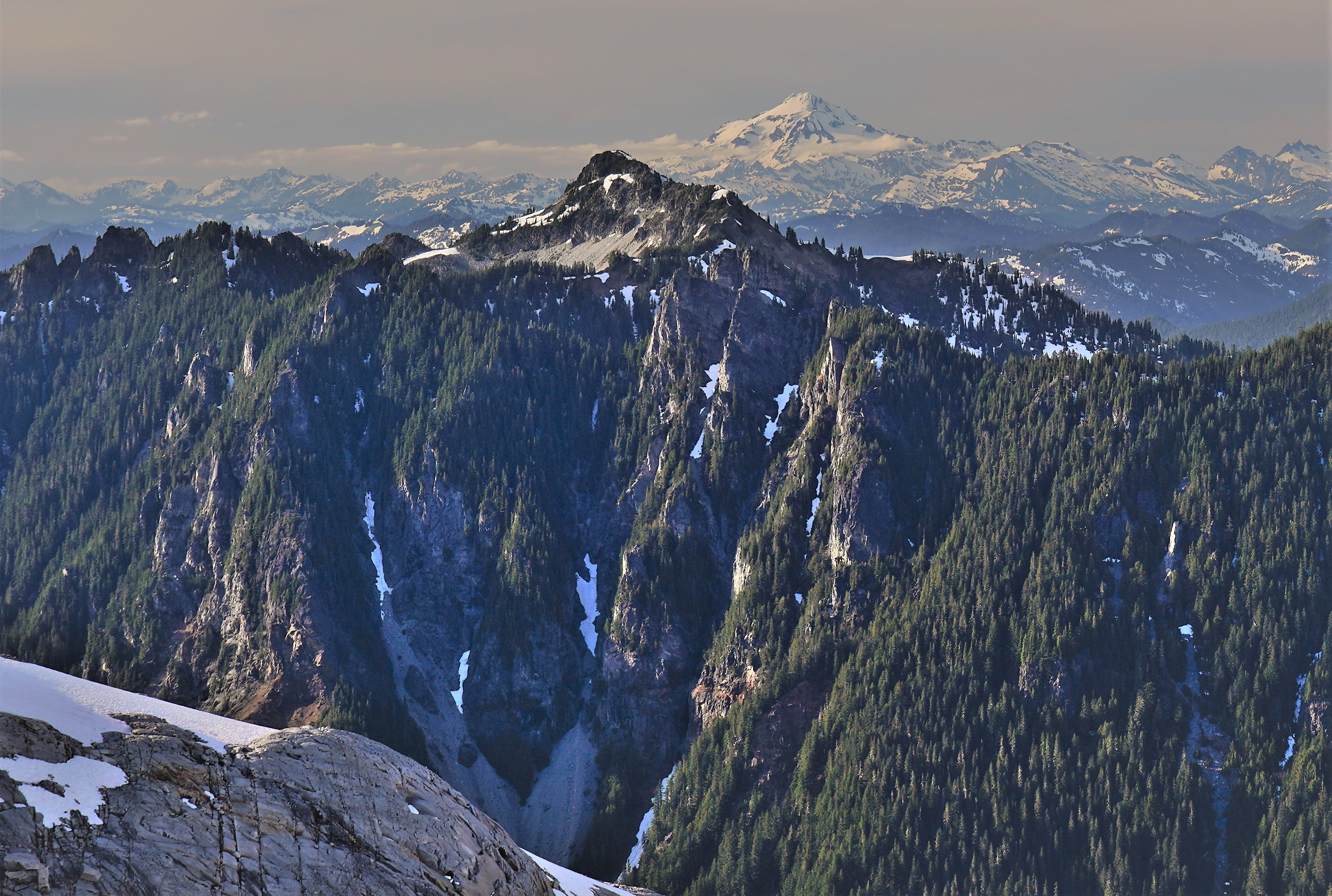
South aspect, with Glacier Peak

East aspect

== See also ==
- List of peaks of the Alpine Lakes Wilderness
