= Snow Creek Glacier =

Glacier in Washington, United States

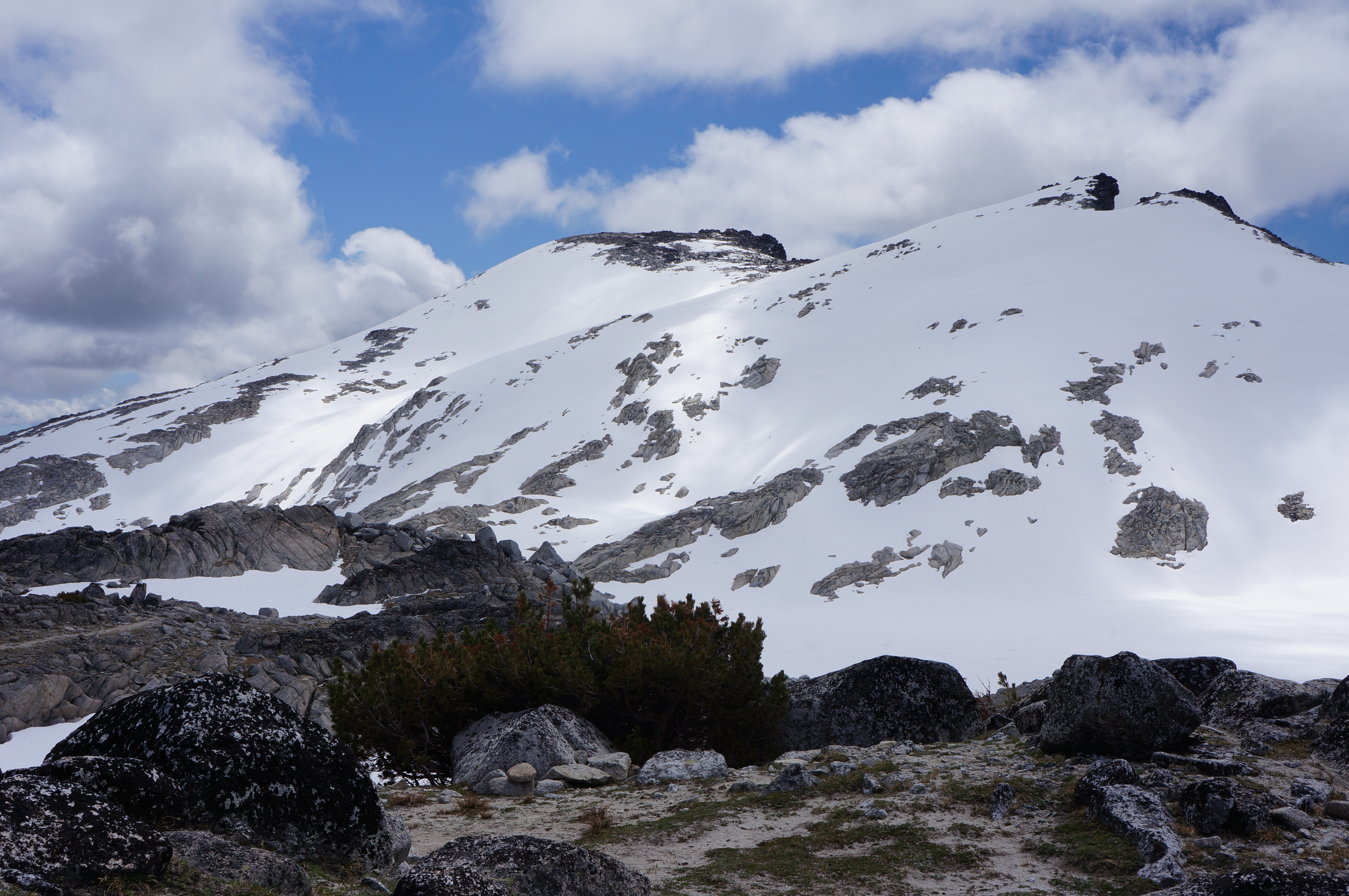
- Snow Creek Glacier on Little Annapurna and West Annapurna in 2018

- Location within Washington (state)
- Type: Alpine glacier
- Location: Wenatchee National Forest, Chelan County, Washington, U.S.
- Coordinates: 47°28′24″N 120°49′15″W
- Terminus: Barren rock
- Status: Retreating/Extinct

Snow Creek Glacier is located on Little Annapurna in the Stuart Range, U.S. state of Washington. Snow Creek Glacier is within the Alpine Lakes Wilderness of Wenatchee National Forest and the Enchantment Lakes region. Snow Creek Glacier consists of several small glacial remnants (glacierets), one of which terminates at Isolation Lake.

Snow Creek Glacier is now said to have disappeared.

== See also ==
- List of glaciers in the United States
