= List of peaks of the Alpine Lakes Wilderness =

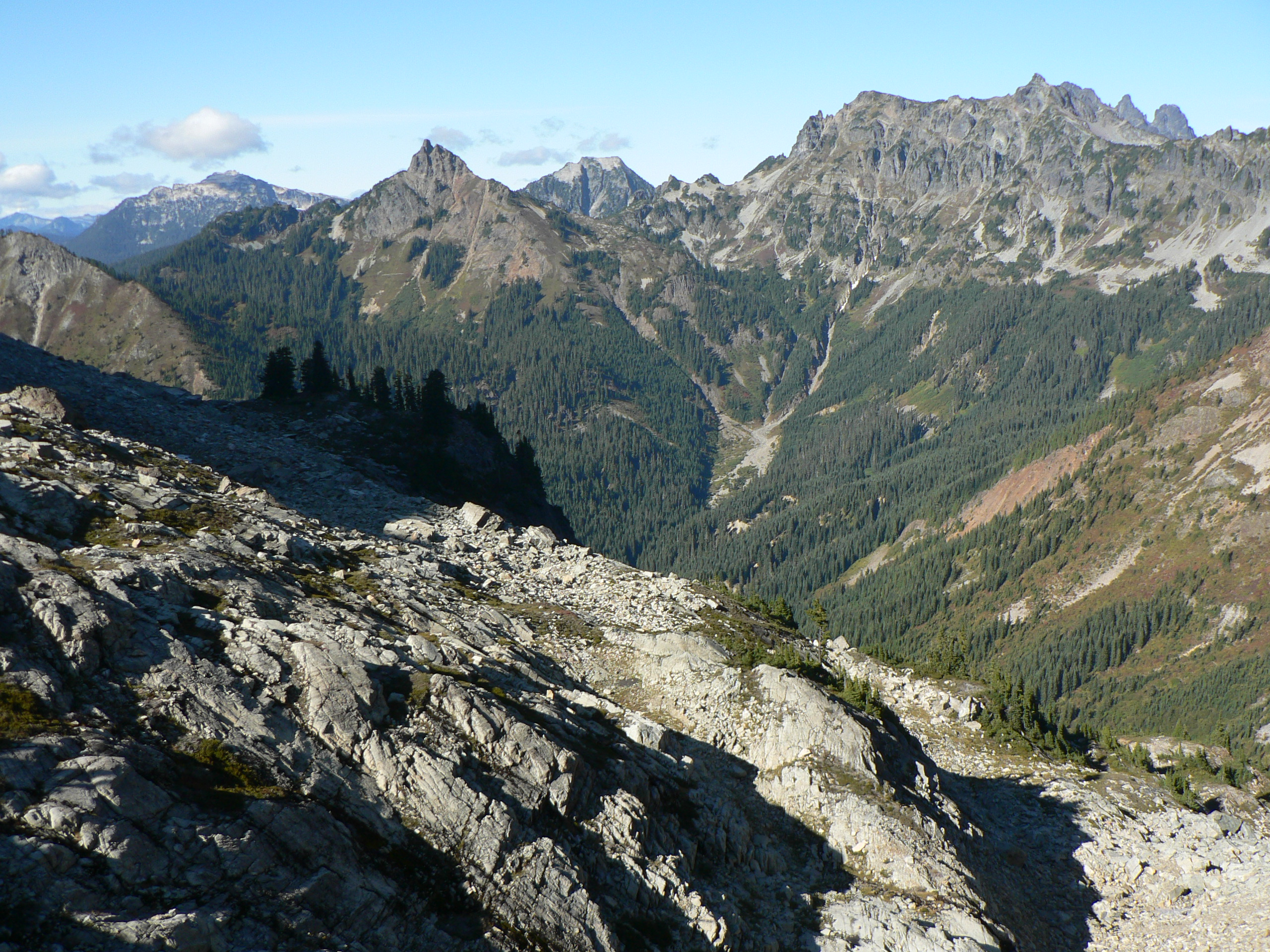
Peaks near Huckleberry Mountain

The Alpine Lakes Wilderness contains a number of mountain peaks and ranges:

== Snoqualmie peaks ==
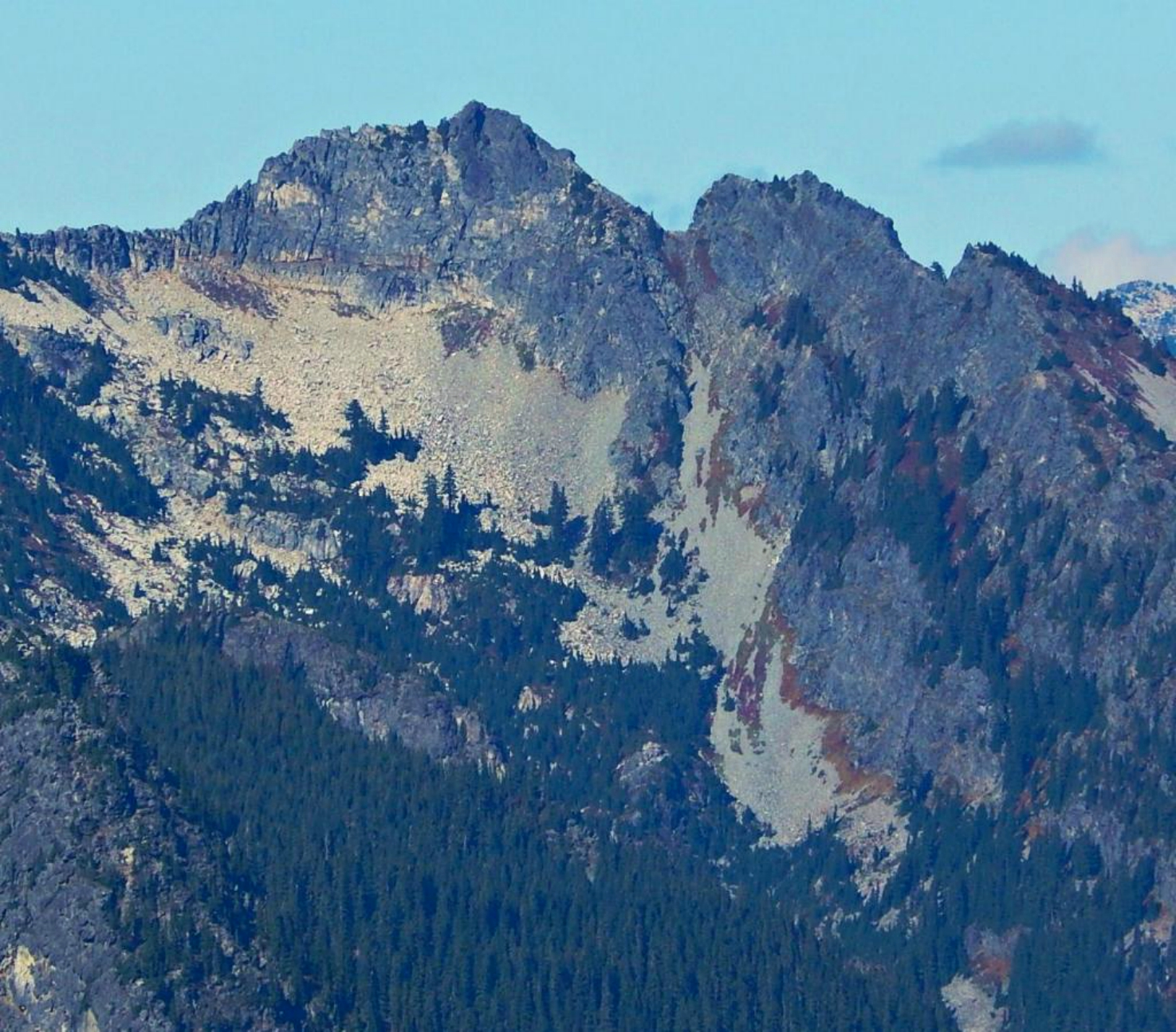
Lundin Peak

- Kaleetan Peak — 6,259 ft (1,908 m)
- Chair Peak — 6,238 ft (1,901 m)
- Denny Mountain — 5,520 feet (1,680 m)
- Guye Peak — 5,168 feet (1,575 m)
- Hibox Mountain — 6,547 feet (1,996 m)
- Snoqualmie Mountain — 6,278 ft (1,914 m)
- Lundin Peak — 6,057 ft (1,846 m)ft
- Red Mountain — 5,890 ft (1,795 m)ft
- Kendall Peak — 5,784.03 ft (1,763 m)
- Mount Thomson — 6,554 ft (1,998 m)
- Bryant Peak — 5,801 ft (1,768 m)
- The Tooth— 5,604 ft (1,708 m)
- Mount Defiance — 5,584 ft (1,702 m)
- Rampart Ridge — 5,870 ft (1,789 m)
- Mount Roosevelt— 5,835 ft (1,779 m)
- Three Queens— 6,687 ft (2,038 m)
- Dungeon Peak — 5,640 ft (1,719 m)
- Alaska Mountain — 5,745 ft (1,751 m)
- Wright Mountain — 5,430 ft (1,655 m)
- Treen Peak — 5,765 feet (1,757 m)

== Dutch Miller Gap peaks ==
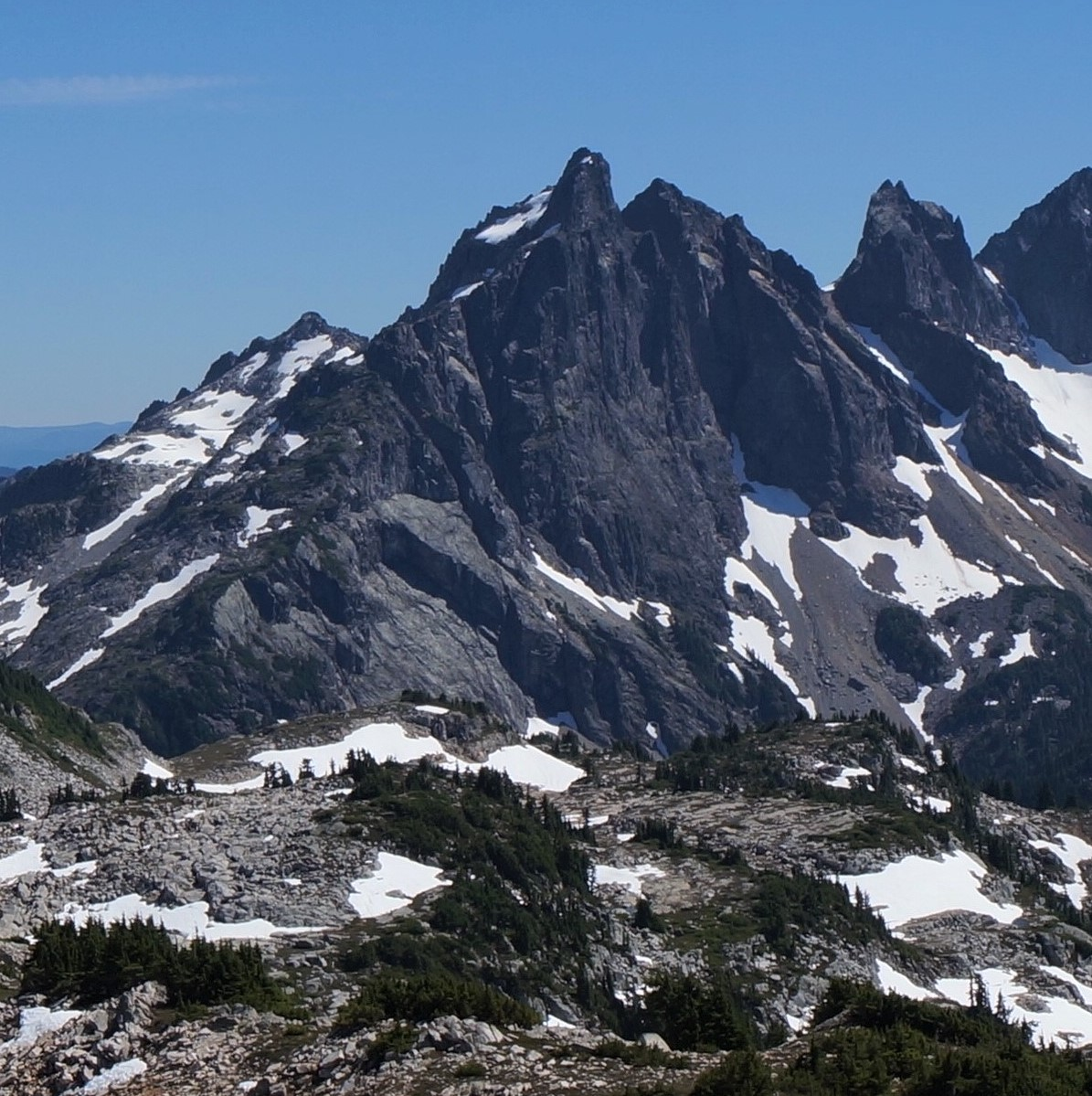
Little Big Chief Mountain

- Chikamin Peak — 6,960 ft (2,121 m)
- Dip Top Peak — 7,291 ft (2,222 m)
- Four Brothers — 6,485 ft (1,977 m)
- Lemah Mountain — 7,480 ft (2,280 m)
- Chimney Rock — 7,721 ft (2,353 m)
- Huckleberry Mountain — 6,320 ft (1,926 m)
- Overcoat Peak — 7,432 ft (2,265 m)
- Summit Chief Mountain — 7,464 ft (2,275 m)
- Mount Hinman — 7,492 ft (2,284 m)
- Mount Daniel — 7,899 ft (2,408 m)
- Little Big Chief Mountain — 7,225 ft (2,202 m)
- Bears Breast Mountain — 7,197 ft (2,194 m)
- Big Snow Mountain — 6,680 ft (2,036 m)
- Cathedral Rock — 6,724 ft (2,049 m)
- La Bohn Peak — 6,585 ft (2,007 m)
- Burnt Boot Peak — 6,520 ft (1,987 m)
- Terrace Mountain — 6,361 ft (1,939 m)
- Iron Cap Mountain — 6,347 ft (1,935 m)
- Malachite Peak— 6,261 ft (1,908 m)

== Wenatchee Mountains ==
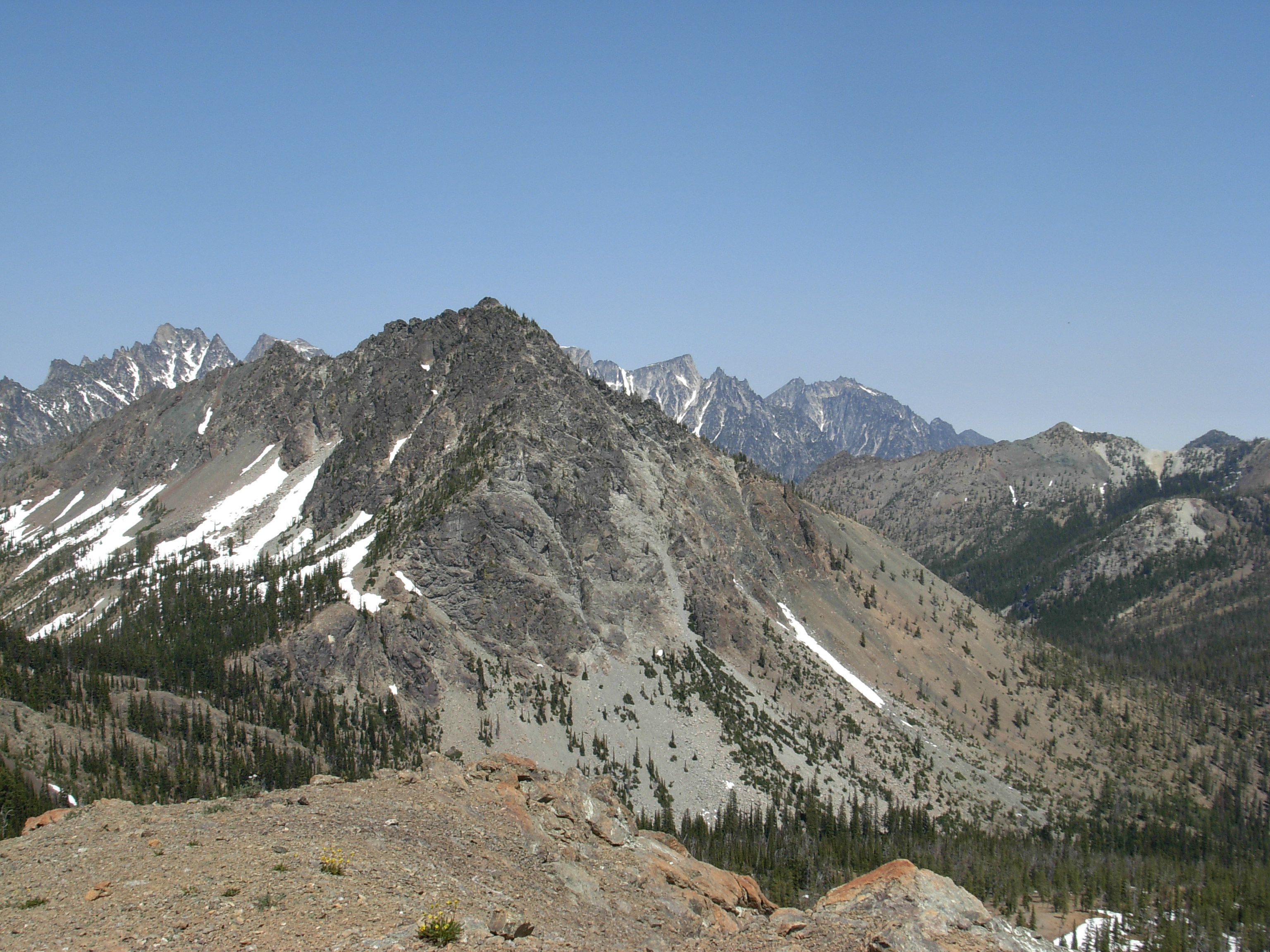
Bills Peak in the Wenatchee Mountains

- Cashmere Mountain — 8,501 ft (2,591 m)
- Eightmile Mountain — 7,996 ft (2,437 m)
- Granite Mountain — 7,144 ft (2,177 m)
- Ingalls Peak — 7,662 ft (2,335 m)
- The Cradle — 7,467 ft (2,276 m)
- Fortune Peak — 7,382 ft (2,250 m)
- Navaho Peak — 7,223 ft (2,202 m)
- Harding Mountain — 7,173 ft (2,186 m)
- Bills Peak — 6,917 ft (2,108 m)
- Mac Peak — 6,859 ft (2,091 m)
- Teanaway Peak — 6,779 ft (2,066 m)
- Surprise Mountain — 6,330 ft (1,929 m)
- Spark Plug Mountain — 6,320 ft (1,926 m)
- Thor Peak — 6,804 ft (2,074 m)
- Three Brothers — 7,303 ft (2,226 m)
- Thunder Mountain — 6,556 ft (1,998 m)
- Trico Mountain — 6,640 ft (2,024 m)

== Chiwaukum Mountains ==
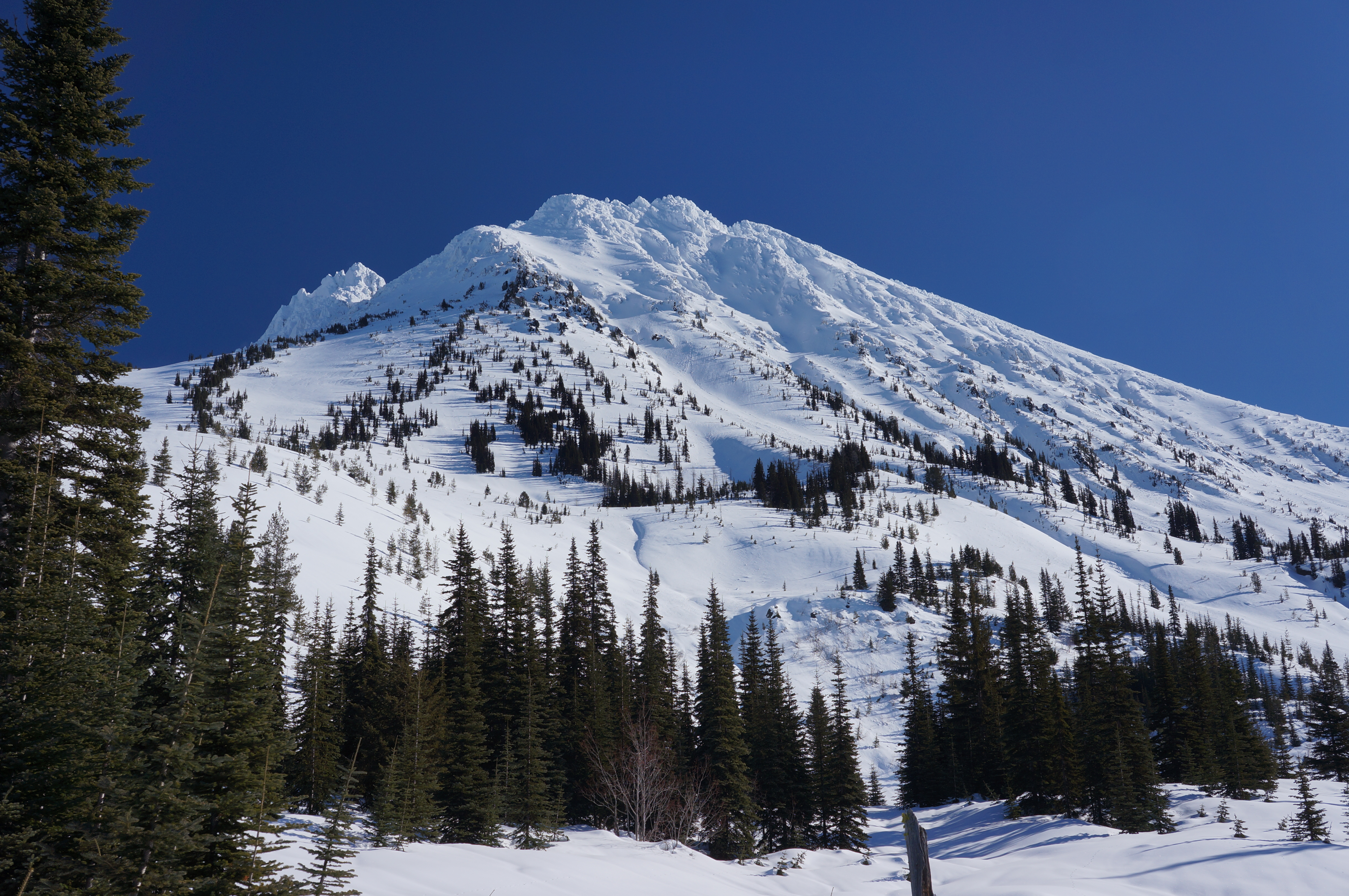
Big Chiwaukum

- Big Chiwaukum — 8,081 ft (2,463 m)
- Snowgrass Mountain — 7,993 ft (2,436 m)
- Big Lou — 7,780 ft (2,371 m)
- Big Jim Mountain — 7,763 ft (2,366 m)
- Ladies Peak — 7,708 ft (2,349 m)
- Grindstone Mountain — 7,533 ft (2,296 m)
- Cape Horn — 7,316 ft (2,230 m)
- Bulls Tooth — 6,840 ft (2,085 m)
- Jim Hill Mountain — 6,765 ft (2,062 m)
- Arrowhead Mountain — 6,030 ft (1,838 m)

== Stuart Range ==
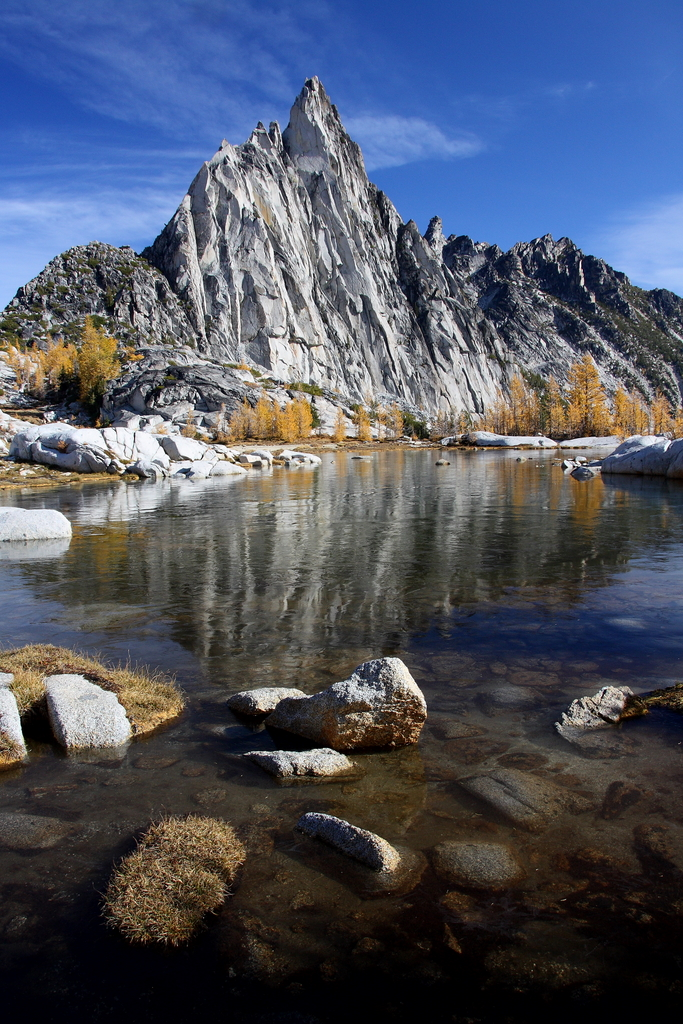
Prusik Peak in the Stuart Range

- Mount Stuart — 9,415 ft (2,870 m)
- Argonaut Peak — 8,453 ft (2,576 m)
- Colchuck Peak — 8,705 ft (2,653 m)
- Dragontail Peak — 8,840 ft (2,694 m)
- Edward Peak — 7,280 ft (2,219 m)
- Enchantment Peak — 8,520 ft (2,597 m)
- Jabberwocky Tower — 6,840 ft (2,085 m)
- Little Annapurna — 8,440 ft (2,573 m)
- McClellan Peak — 8,364 ft (2,549 m)
- Prusik Peak — 8,000 ft (2,438 m)
- Cannon Mountain — 8,638 ft (2,633 m)
- The Temple — 8,292 ft (2,527 m)
- Witches Tower — 8,520 ft (2,597 m)
- Wedge Mountain — 5,860 ft (1,786 m)
- The Enchantments

== See also ==
- List of lakes in the Alpine Lakes Wilderness
- Ecology of the North Cascades
- Geography of the North Cascades
- List of highest mountain peaks in Washington
