= Prusik Peak =

Mountain in Washington (state), United States

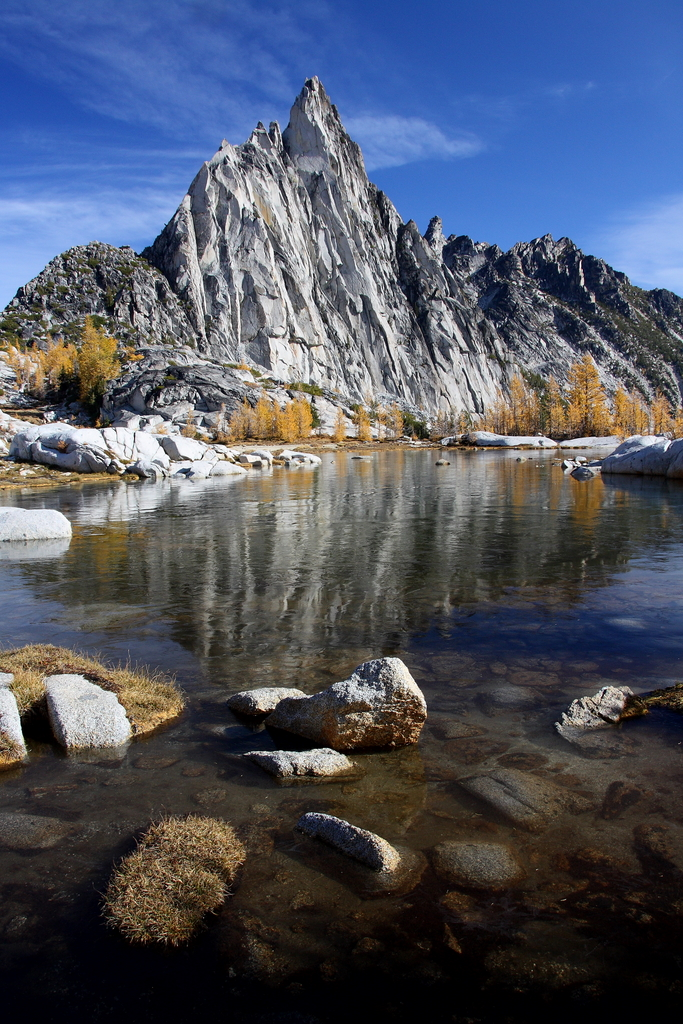
- Prusik Peak seen from Gnome Tarn

Highest point
- Elevation: 8,008 ft (2,441 m)
- Prominence: 177 ft (54 m)
- Parent peak: The Temple
- Isolation: 0.76 mi (1.22 km)
- Coordinates: 47°29′15″N 120°47′04″W

Geography
- Location within Washington (state) Location within the United States
- Country: United States
- State: Washington
- County: Chelan
- Protected area: Alpine Lakes Wilderness
- Parent range: Cascade Range; Wenatchee Mountains; Stuart Range
- Topo map: USGS Enchantment Lakes

Geology
- Rock type: Granite

Climbing
- First ascent: May 1948 by Fred Beckey and Art Holben
- Easiest route: Climbing class 5.7

Prusik Peak is an 8,008-foot (2,441-metre) granite summit located at the west end of The Temple in Chelan County of Washington state. Prusik Peak is part of The Enchantments within the Alpine Lakes Wilderness and is often the iconic photographic image of both areas. Prusik Peak belongs to the Stuart Range which is a subset of the Cascade Range. The toponym honors Dr. Karl Prusik (1896–1961) who was an Austrian mountaineer, known as the inventor of the prusik, a rope knot which happened to be used to gain access to the summit horn during the first ascent by Fred Beckey in 1948. Precipitation runoff drains into Icicle Creek which is a tributary of the Wenatchee River.

== Climate ==
According to the Köppen climate classification system, Prusik Peak is located in an alpine climate zone. Weather fronts originating in the north Pacific Ocean travel east toward the Cascade Mountains. As fronts approach, they are forced upward by the peaks (orographic lift), causing them to drop their moisture in the form of rain or snow onto the Cascades. As a result, the Cascades experience high precipitation, especially during the winter months in the form of snowfall. Because of maritime influence, snow tends to be wet and heavy, resulting in high avalanche danger. During winter months, weather is usually cloudy, but due to high pressure systems over the Pacific Ocean that intensify during summer months, there is often little or no cloud cover during the summer.

== Geology ==
The Alpine Lakes Wilderness features some of the most rugged topography in the Cascade Range with craggy peaks and ridges, deep glacial valleys, and granite walls spotted with over 700 mountain lakes. Geological events occurring many years ago created the diverse topography and drastic elevation changes over the Cascade Range leading to the various climate differences.

The history of the formation of the Cascade Mountains dates back millions of years ago to the late Eocene Epoch. With the North American Plate overriding the Pacific Plate, episodes of volcanic igneous activity persisted. In addition, small fragments of the oceanic and continental lithosphere called terranes created the North Cascades about 50 million years ago.

During the Pleistocene period dating back over two million years ago, glaciation advancing and retreating repeatedly scoured the landscape leaving deposits of rock debris. The last glacial retreat in the Alpine Lakes area began about 14,000 years ago and was north of the Canada–US border by 10,000 years ago. The U-shaped cross section of the river valleys is a result of that recent glaciation. Uplift and faulting in combination with glaciation have been the dominant processes which have created the tall peaks and deep valleys of the Alpine Lakes Wilderness area.

== Climbing Routes ==
Established rock climbing routes on Prusik Peak:

- East Route – First ascent 1948
- West Ridge – class 5.7 4 pitches FA 1957
- South Face Beckey-Davis Route – class 5.9 7 pitches FA 1962
- Stanley-Burgner Route – class 5.10a 6 pitches FA 1968
- Solid Gold – class 5.11a 5 pitches FA 1989
- Der Sportsman – class 5.11+ 6 pitches

== See also ==
- List of peaks of the Alpine Lakes Wilderness
- Geology of the Pacific Northwest
- Geography of Washington (state)

== Gallery ==
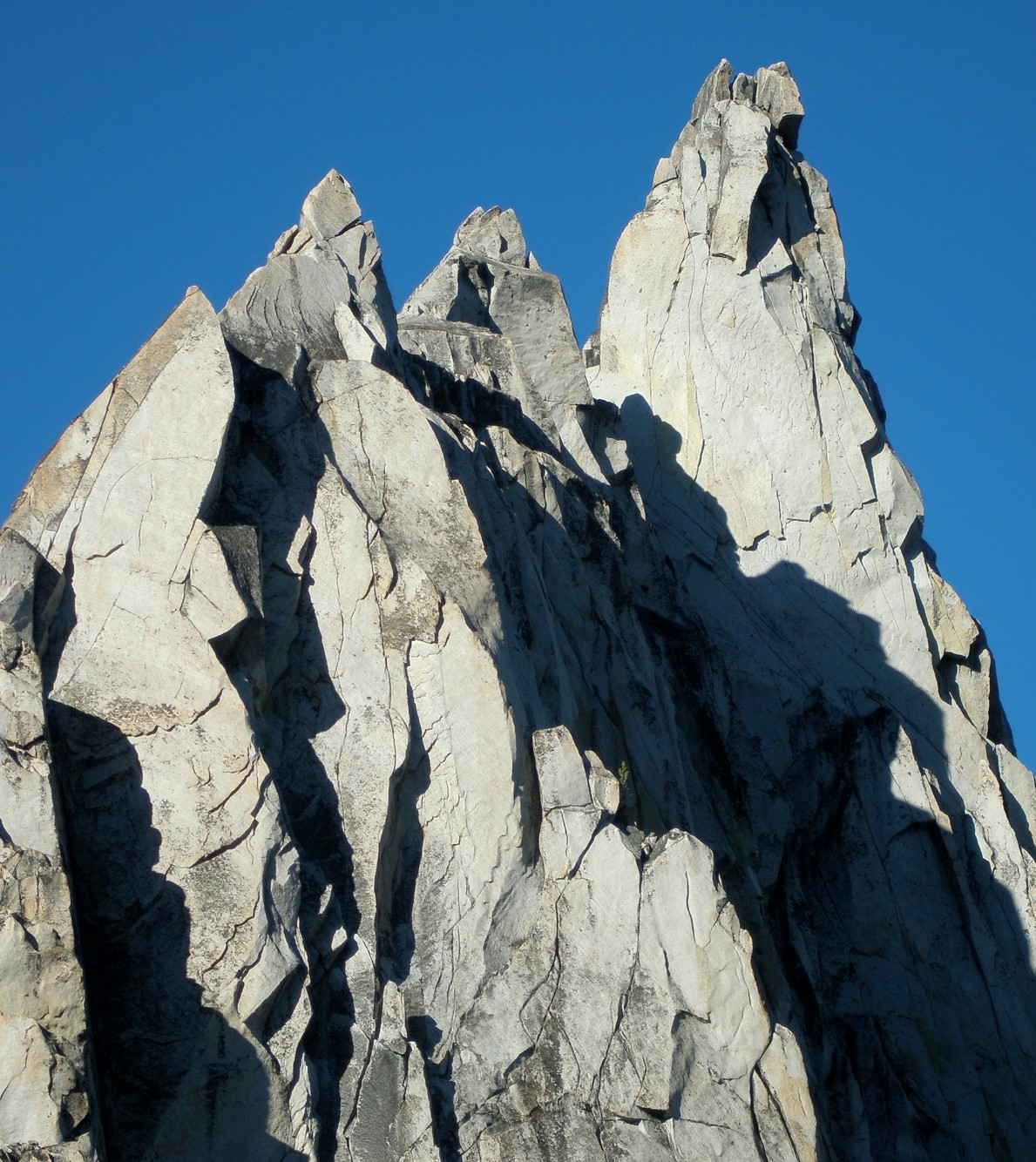
summit detail

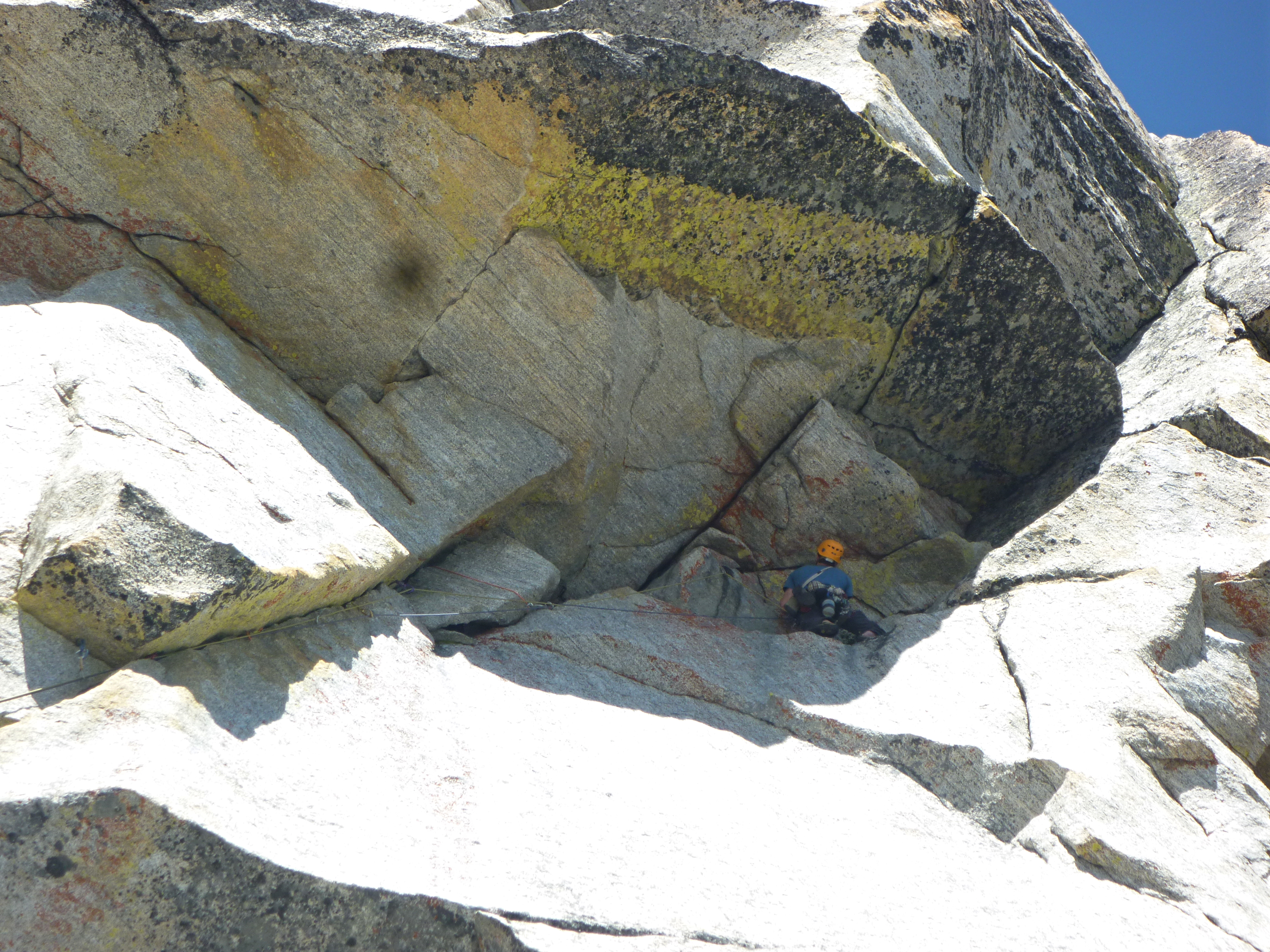
Climbing Solid Gold route

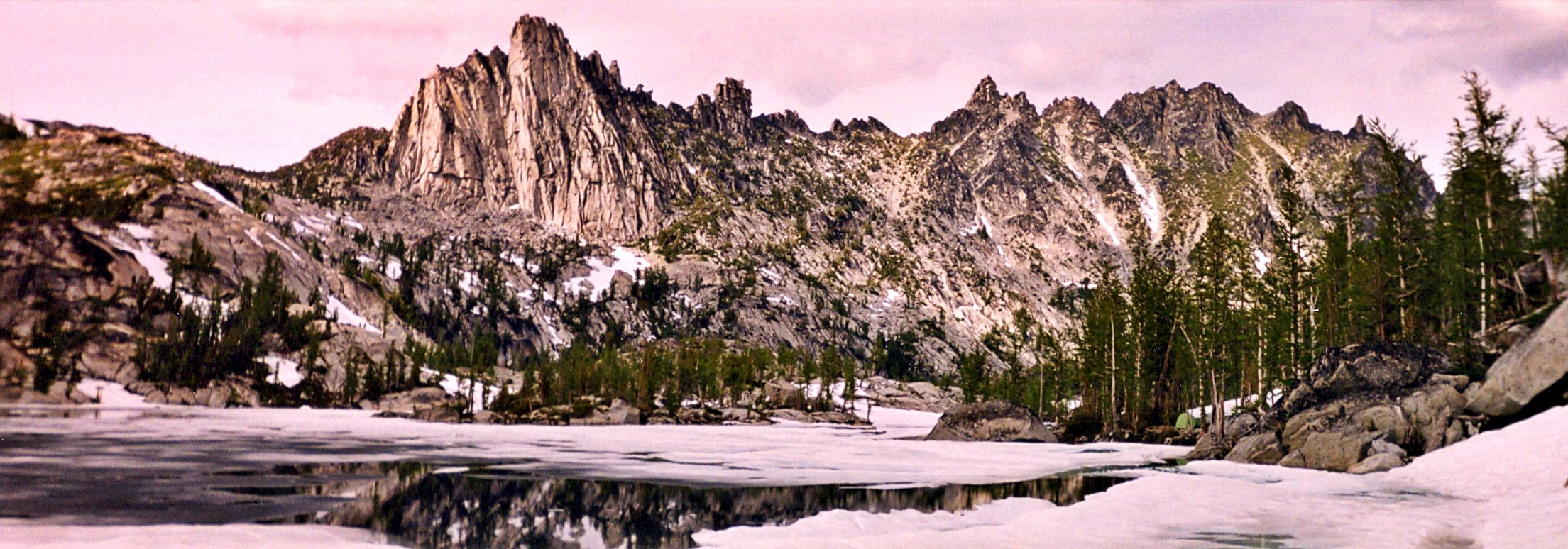
Prusik Peak (left) seen from Leprechaun Lake along with other towers of The Temple

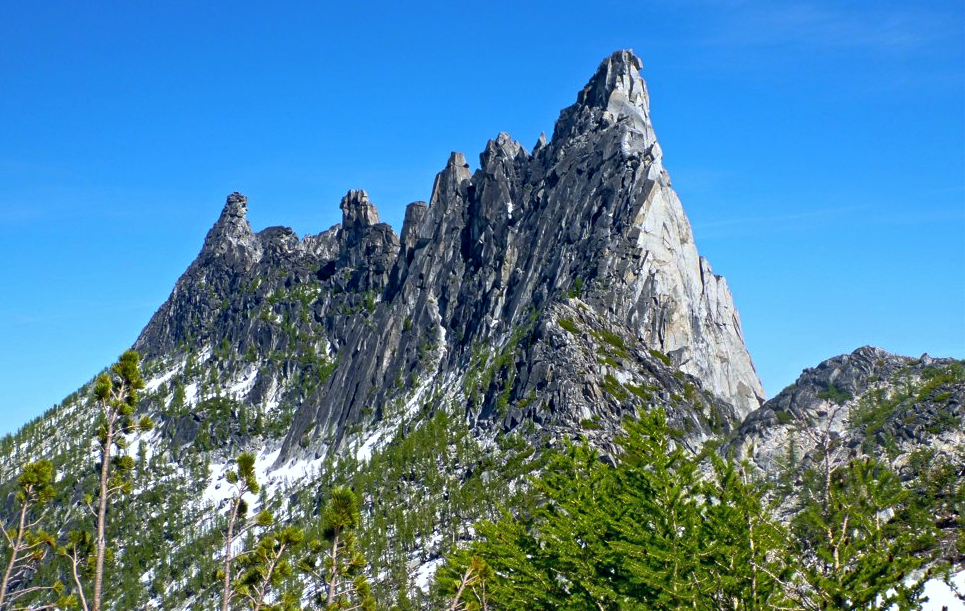
West aspect
