= Karl Prusik =

Austrian mountaineer (1896–1961)

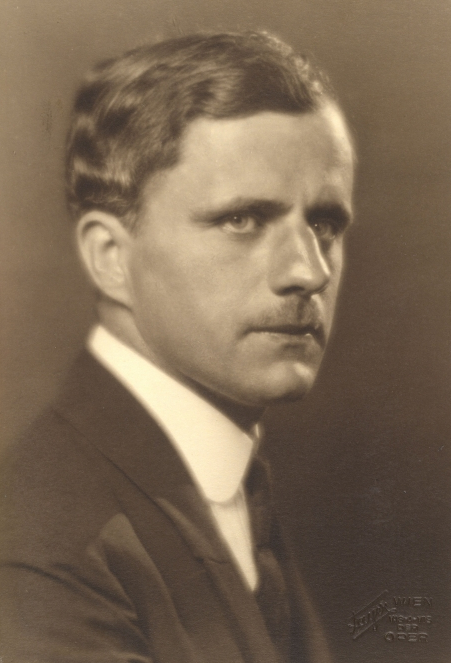

Personal information
- Nationality: Austrian
- Born: 19 May 1896
- Died: 8 May 1961 (aged 64)

Karl Prusik (1896–1961) was an Austrian mountaineer. Prusik served twice as President of the Austrian Alpine Club (AAC) and is credited with establishing over 70 ascents and routes. He is also recognised as the inventor of the Prusik knot (sometimes misspelled as Prussic).

Prusik was born on 19 May 1896 in Vienna, Austria. After the Anschluss, Prusik was a supporter of the then Nazi German Alpine Club (German: Deutscher Alpenverein) led by Arthur Seuss-Inquart. In 1941, at the age of 45, Prusik was called to serve as a lieutenant in the Nazi German Wehrmacht. In 1942, he was promoted to captain and received the War Merit Cross, 2nd class, for operations behind the Nazi front.

In 1947, Prusik became the first Vice President of the Österreichischer Alpenklub (ÖAK.). Prusik Peak in the Cascade Range of Washington state is named in honour of Karl Prusik. Also, a route in the Slovenian Alps was named after Karl Prusik and his climbing partner, Roman Szalay. He died on 8 May 1961 in Perchtoldsdorf, Austria, at the age of 64.
