= McClellan Peak =

Mountain in Washington (state), United States

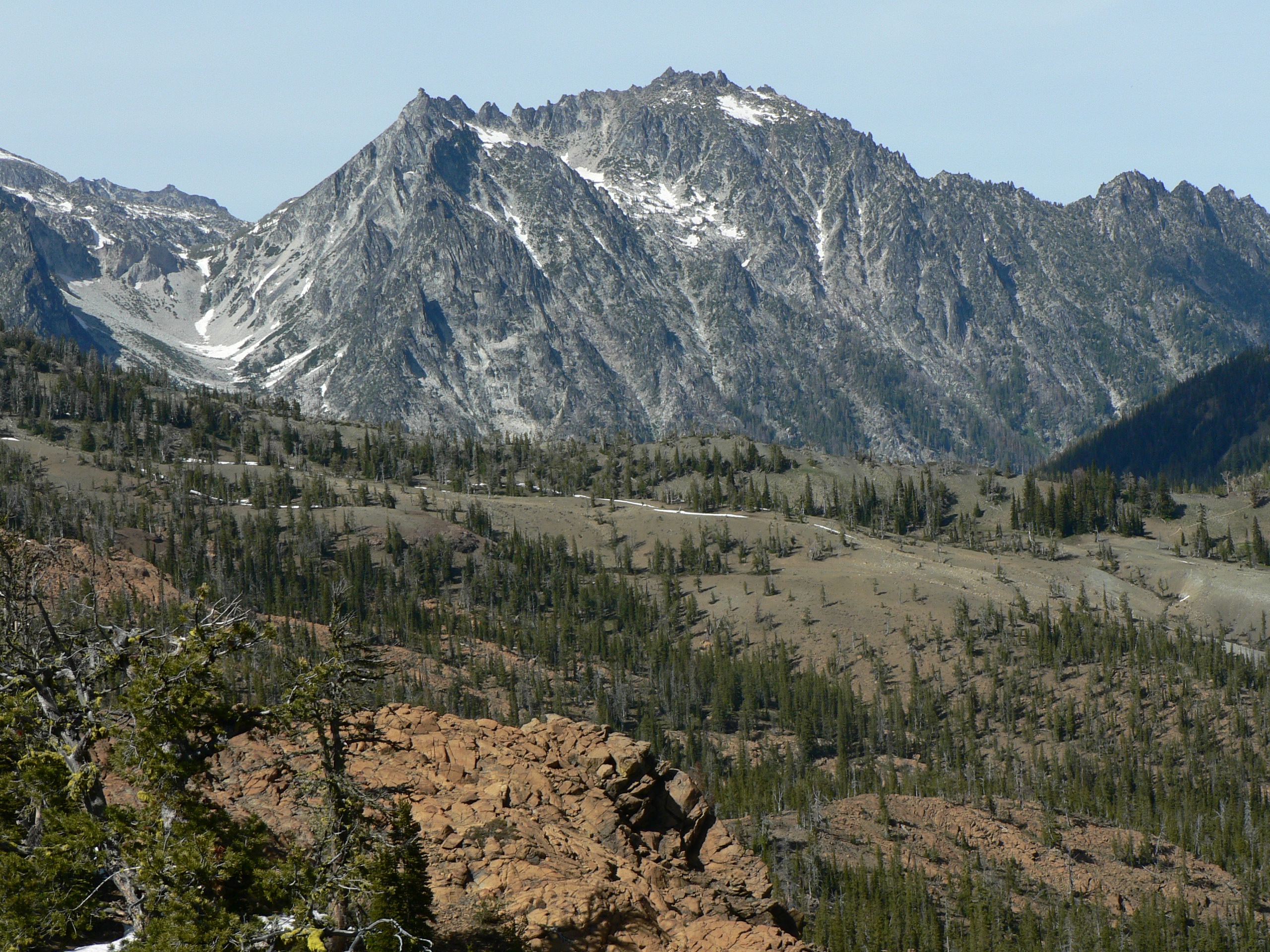
- Southwest aspect, from Earl Peak

Highest point
- Elevation: 8,368 ft (2,551 m)
- Prominence: 1,248 ft (380 m)
- Parent peak: Little Annapurna (8,485 ft)
- Isolation: 1.35 mi (2.17 km)
- Coordinates: 47°28′13″N 120°47′09″W

Geography
- Location within Washington (state) Location within the United States
- Country: United States
- State: Washington
- County: Chelan
- Protected area: Alpine Lakes Wilderness
- Parent range: Cascade Range
- Topo map: USGS Enchantment Lakes

Geology
- Rock age: Late Cretaceous
- Rock type: Tonalitic plutons

Climbing
- First ascent: July 5, 1946 by Ken Prestrud, Keith Rankin, William Herston
- Easiest route: class 3 scrambling

McClellan Peak is an 8,368-foot (2,551-metre) summit located in Chelan County of Washington state. The toponym honors Army explorer George B. McClellan who visited the area in 1853. McClellan Peak forms part of the south rim of The Enchantments lake basin within the Alpine Lakes Wilderness, and it belongs to the Stuart Range which is subset of the Cascade Range. McClellan Peak is situated 1.29 miles east of Little Annapurna which is its nearest higher neighbor. Precipitation runoff drains into tributaries of the Wenatchee River.

== Climate ==
Weather fronts coming off the Pacific Ocean travel east toward the Cascade Mountains. As fronts approach, they are forced upward by the peaks of the Cascade Range, causing them to drop their moisture in the form of rain or snow onto the Cascades (Orographic lift). As a result, the Cascades experience high precipitation, especially during the winter months in the form of snowfall. Because of maritime influence, snow tends to be wet and heavy, resulting in high avalanche danger. During winter months, weather is usually cloudy, but, due to high pressure systems over the Pacific Ocean that intensify during summer months, there is often little or no cloud cover during the summer.

== Geology ==
The Alpine Lakes Wilderness features some of the most rugged topography in the Cascade Range with craggy peaks and ridges, deep glacial valleys, and granite walls spotted with over 700 mountain lakes. Geological events occurring many years ago created the diverse topography and drastic elevation changes over the Cascade Range leading to the various climate differences.

The history of the formation of the Cascade Mountains dates back millions of years ago to the late Eocene Epoch. With the North American Plate overriding the Pacific Plate, episodes of volcanic igneous activity persisted. In addition, small fragments of the oceanic and continental lithosphere called terranes created the North Cascades about 50 million years ago.

During the Pleistocene period dating back over two million years ago, glaciation advancing and retreating repeatedly scoured the landscape leaving deposits of rock debris. The last glacial retreat in the Alpine Lakes area began about 14,000 years ago and was north of the Canada–US border by 10,000 years ago. The U-shaped cross section of the river valleys is a result of that recent glaciation. Uplift and faulting in combination with glaciation have been the dominant processes which have created the tall peaks and deep valleys of the Alpine Lakes Wilderness area.

== See also ==
- List of peaks of the Alpine Lakes Wilderness
- Geography of Washington (state)

== Gallery ==
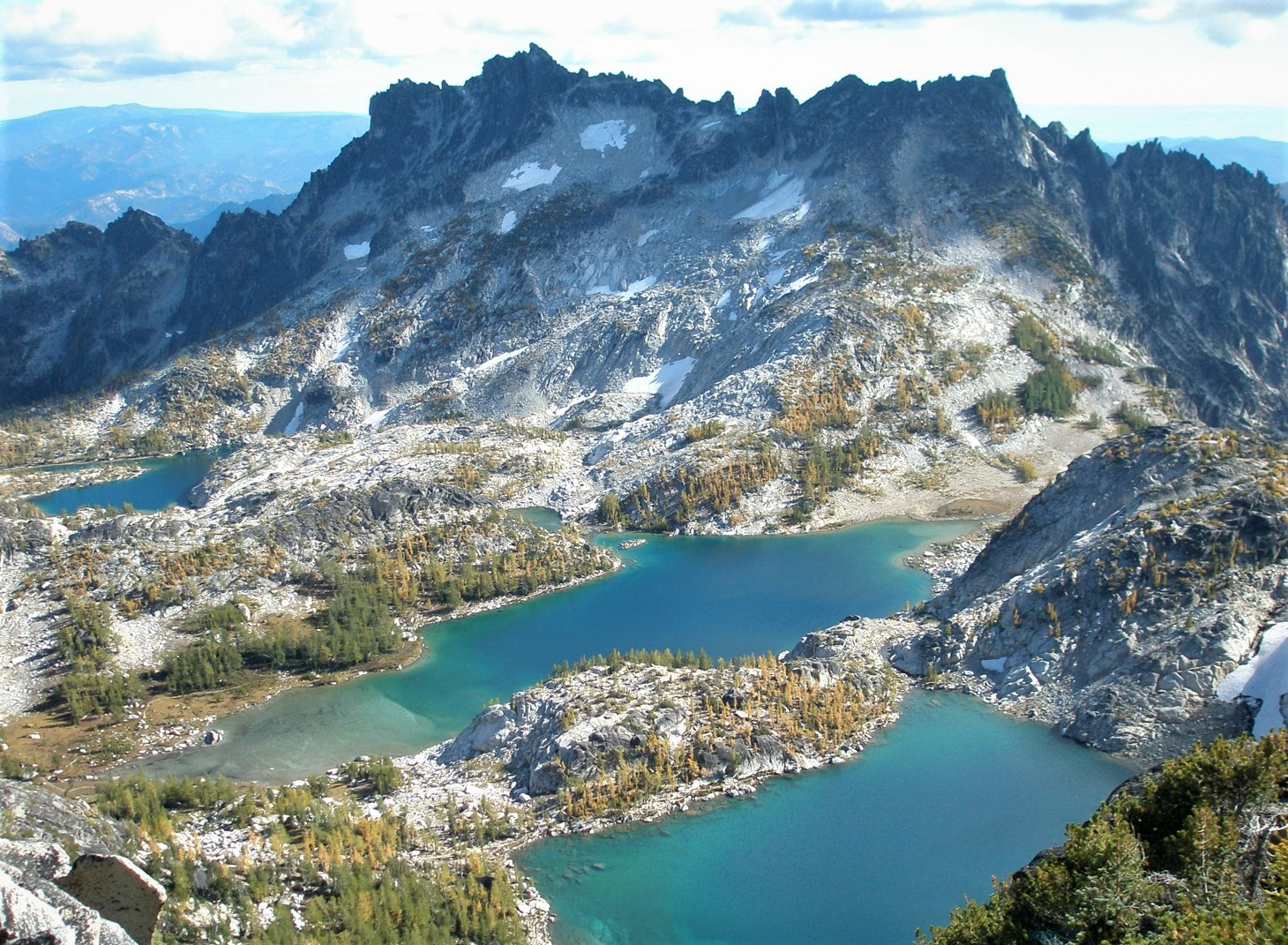
McClellan from Enchantment Peak

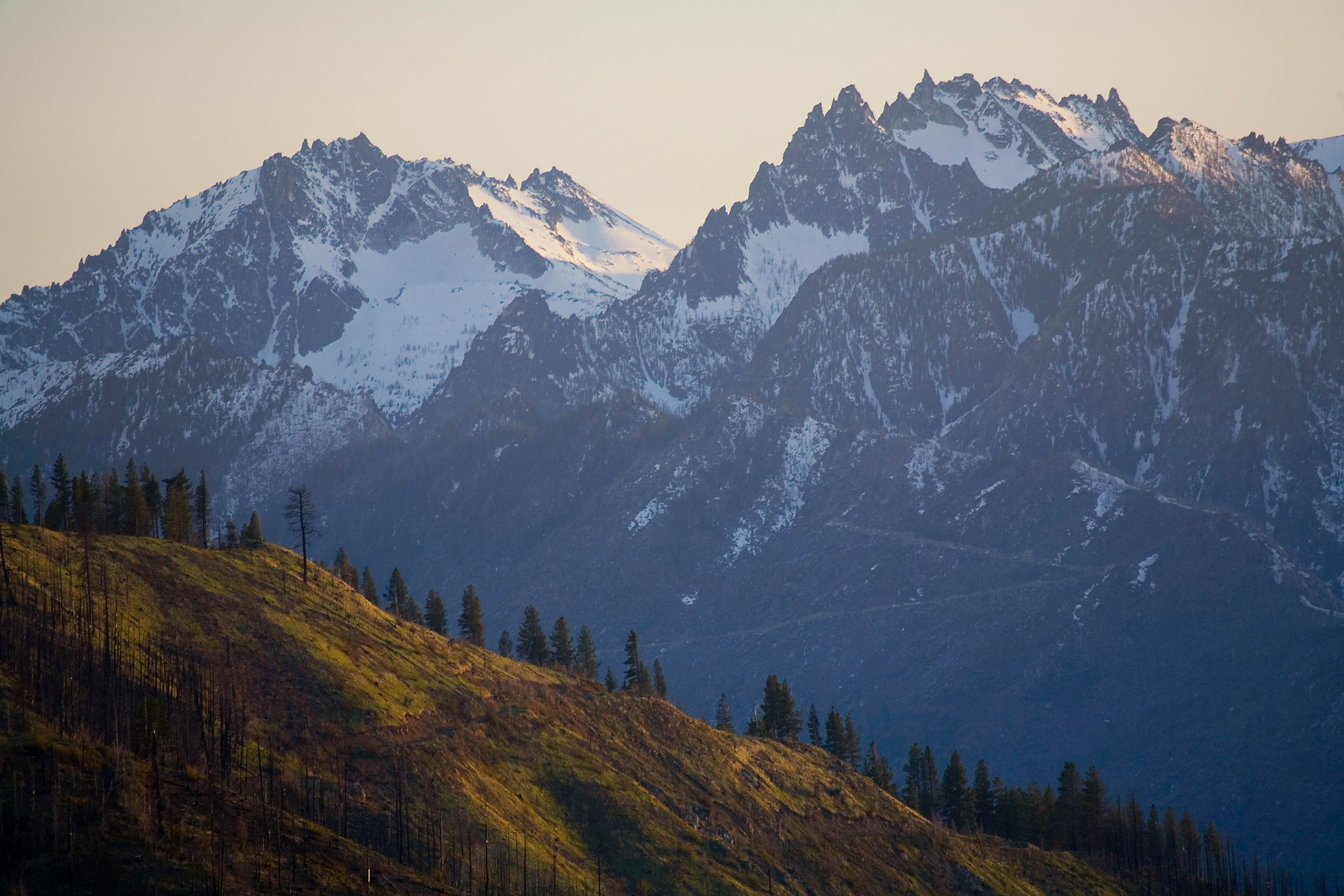
McClellan Peak (left) and The Temple (right)

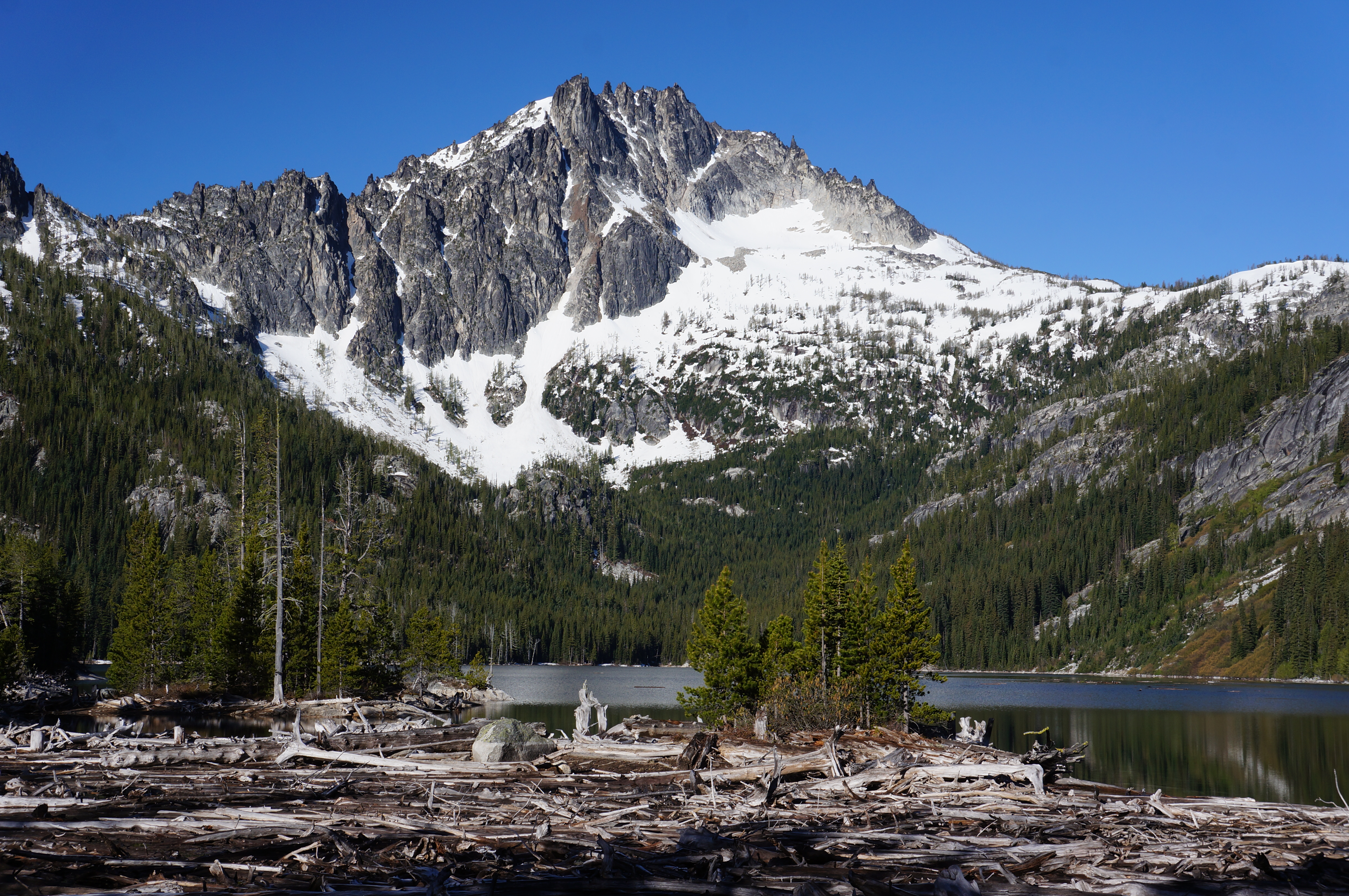
McClellan Peak seen from Upper Snow Lake

McClellan Peak above Leprechaun Lake, July 2026
