= The Temple (Washington) =

Mountain in Washington (state), United States

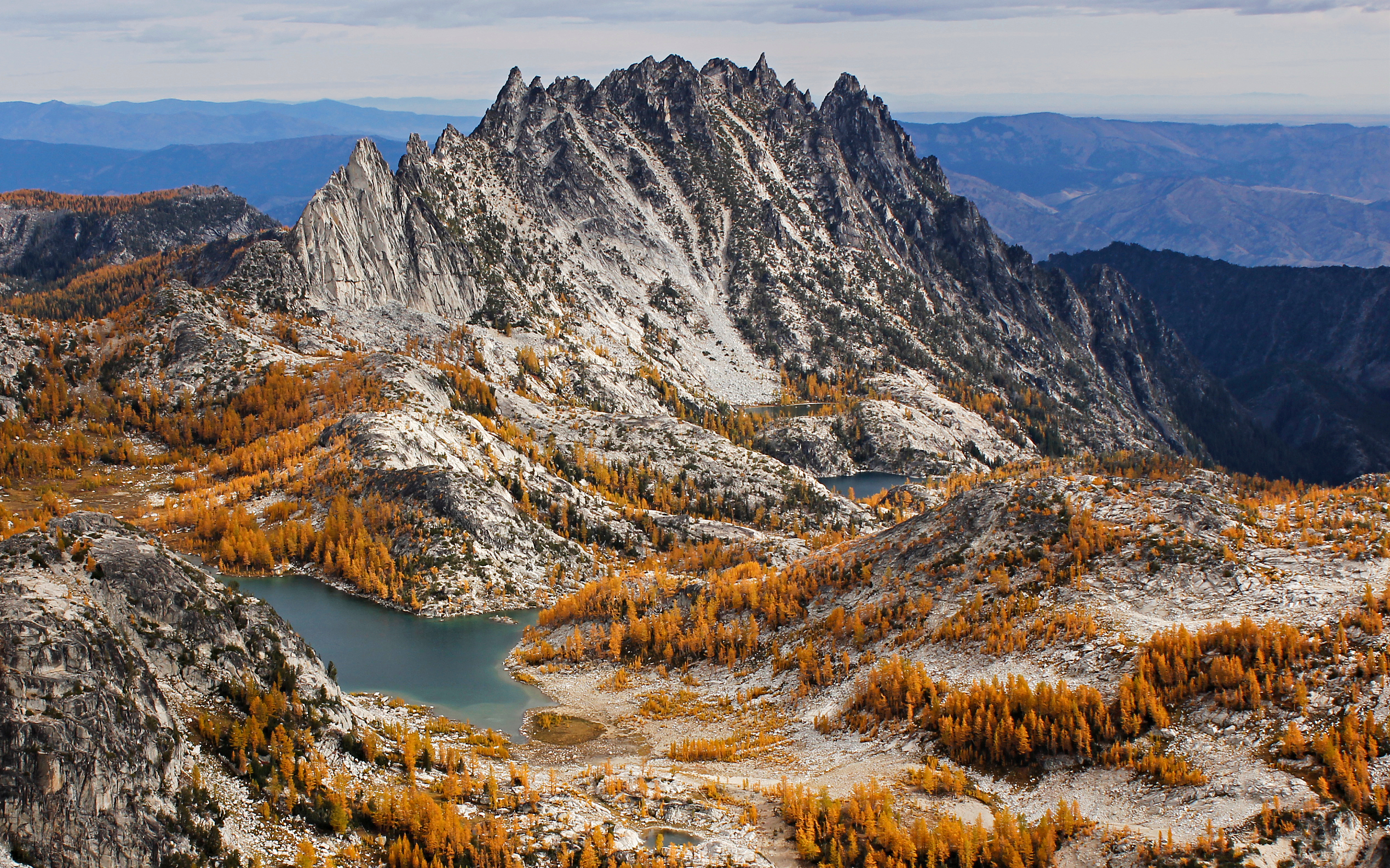
- The Temple seen from Little Annapurna

Highest point
- Elevation: 8,295 ft (2,528 m)
- Prominence: 837 ft (255 m)
- Parent peak: Enchantment Peak
- Isolation: 1.58 mi (2.54 km)
- Coordinates: 47°29′26″N 120°46′10″W

Geography
- Location within Washington (state) Location within the United States
- Country: United States
- State: Washington
- County: Chelan
- Protected area: Alpine Lakes Wilderness
- Parent range: Stuart Range; Wenatchee Mountains; Cascade Range
- Topo map: USGS Enchantment Lakes

Geology
- Rock type: Granite

Climbing
- First ascent: 1942 by Fred Beckey
- Easiest route: class 5.3 Climbing

The Temple is an 8,295-foot (2,528-metre) granite mountain summit located in Chelan County of Washington state. The Temple is part of The Enchantments, set within the Alpine Lakes Wilderness. The Temple belongs to the Stuart Range which is a subset of the Cascade Range. The nearest higher peak is Enchantment Peak, 1.55 miles (2.49 km) to the west, and the nearest town is Leavenworth, 8 miles (13 km) to the northeast. The mountain hosts many granite spires with names like The High Priest, The Boxtop, Flake Tower, Comet Spire, Razorback Spire, The Meteor, The Professor, Lighthouse Tower, Black Pyramid, and the most recognizable Prusik Peak. The highest point of the mountain is called Mt. Temple. Precipitation runoff from the mountain drains into Snow Creek which is a tributary of Icicle Creek.

== Climate ==
Weather fronts coming off the Pacific Ocean travel east toward the Cascade Mountains. As fronts approach, they are forced upward by the peaks of the Cascade Range, causing them to drop their moisture in the form of rain or snow onto the Cascades (Orographic lift). As a result, the Cascades experience high precipitation, especially during the winter months in the form of snowfall. During winter months, weather is usually cloudy, but due to high pressure systems over the Pacific Ocean that intensify during summer months, there is often little or no cloud cover during the summer.

== Geology ==
The Alpine Lakes Wilderness features some of the most rugged topography in the Cascade Range with craggy peaks and ridges, deep glacial valleys, and granite walls spotted with over 700 mountain lakes. Geological events occurring many years ago created the diverse topography and drastic elevation changes over the Cascade Range leading to the various climate differences.

The history of the formation of the Cascade Mountains dates back millions of years ago to the late Eocene Epoch. With the North American Plate overriding the Pacific Plate, episodes of volcanic igneous activity persisted. In addition, small fragments of the oceanic and continental lithosphere called terranes created the North Cascades about 50 million years ago.

During the Pleistocene period dating back over two million years ago, glaciation advancing and retreating repeatedly scoured the landscape leaving deposits of rock debris. The last glacial retreat in the Alpine Lakes area began about 14,000 years ago and was north of the Canada–US border by 10,000 years ago. The U-shaped cross section of the river valleys is a result of that recent glaciation. Uplift and faulting in combination with glaciation have been the dominant processes which have created the tall peaks and deep valleys of the Alpine Lakes Wilderness area.

== See also ==
- List of peaks of the Alpine Lakes Wilderness
- Geology of the Pacific Northwest
- Geography of Washington (state)

== Gallery ==
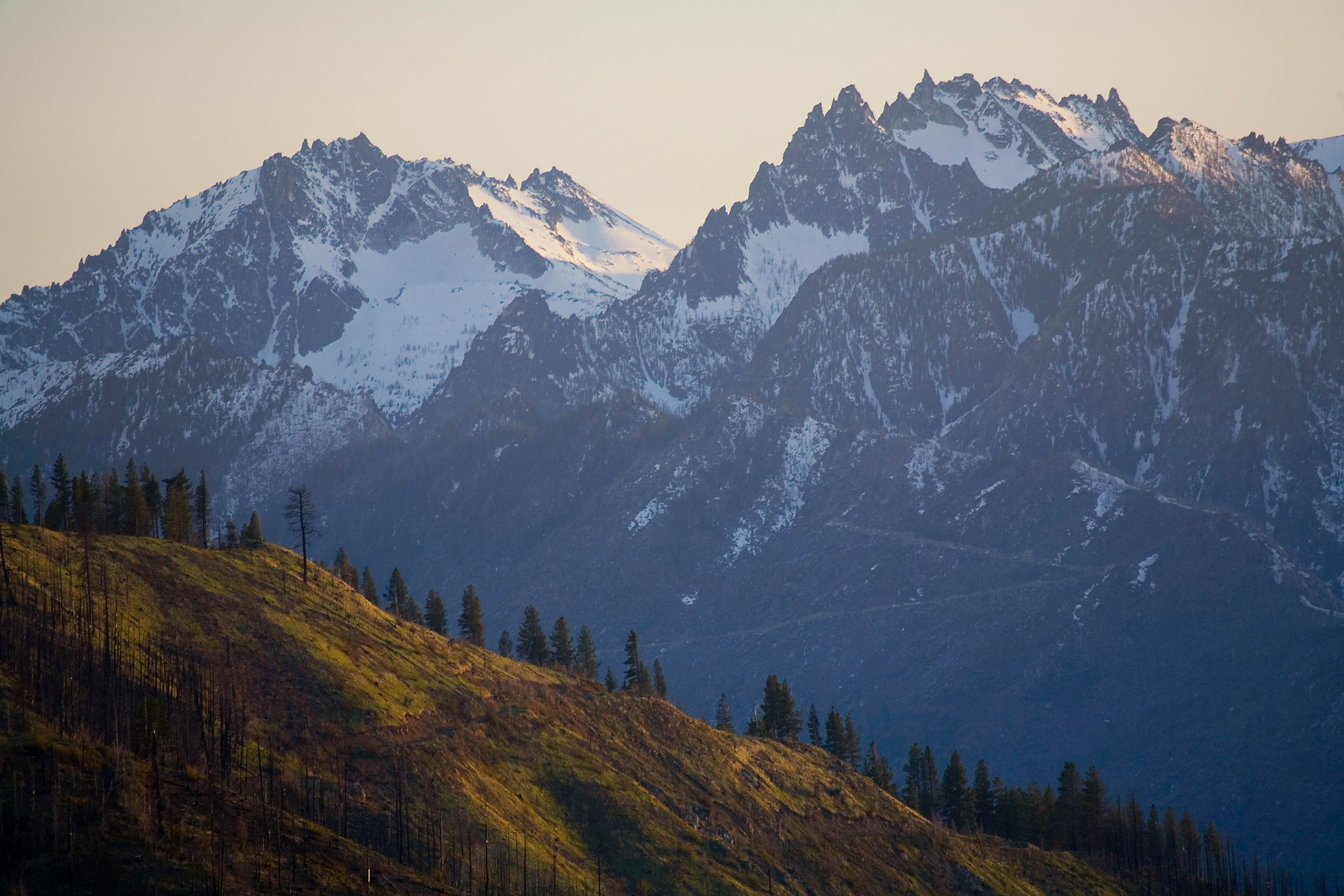
McClellan Peak (left) and The Temple from NE

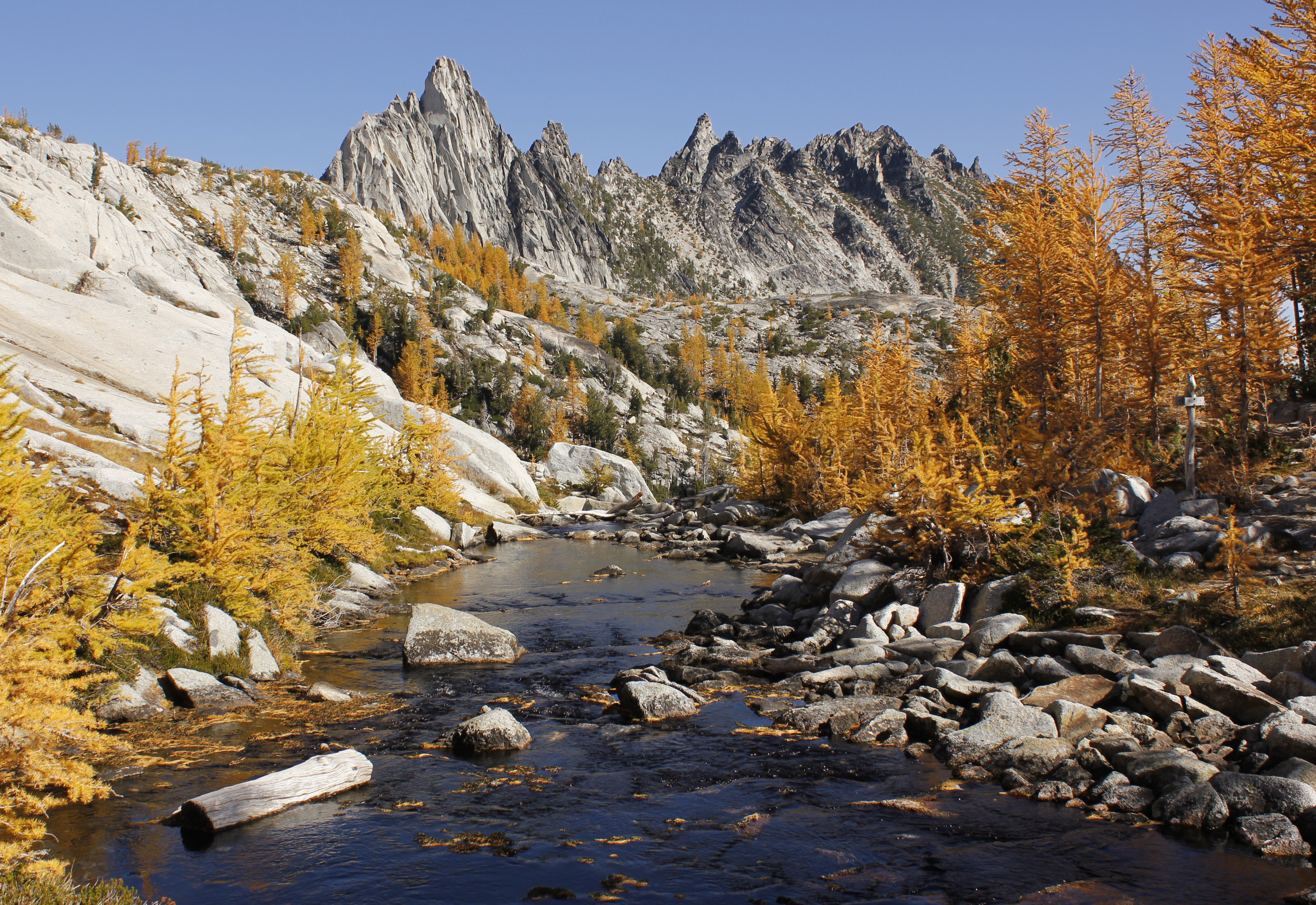
Prusik Peak and The Temple in autumn

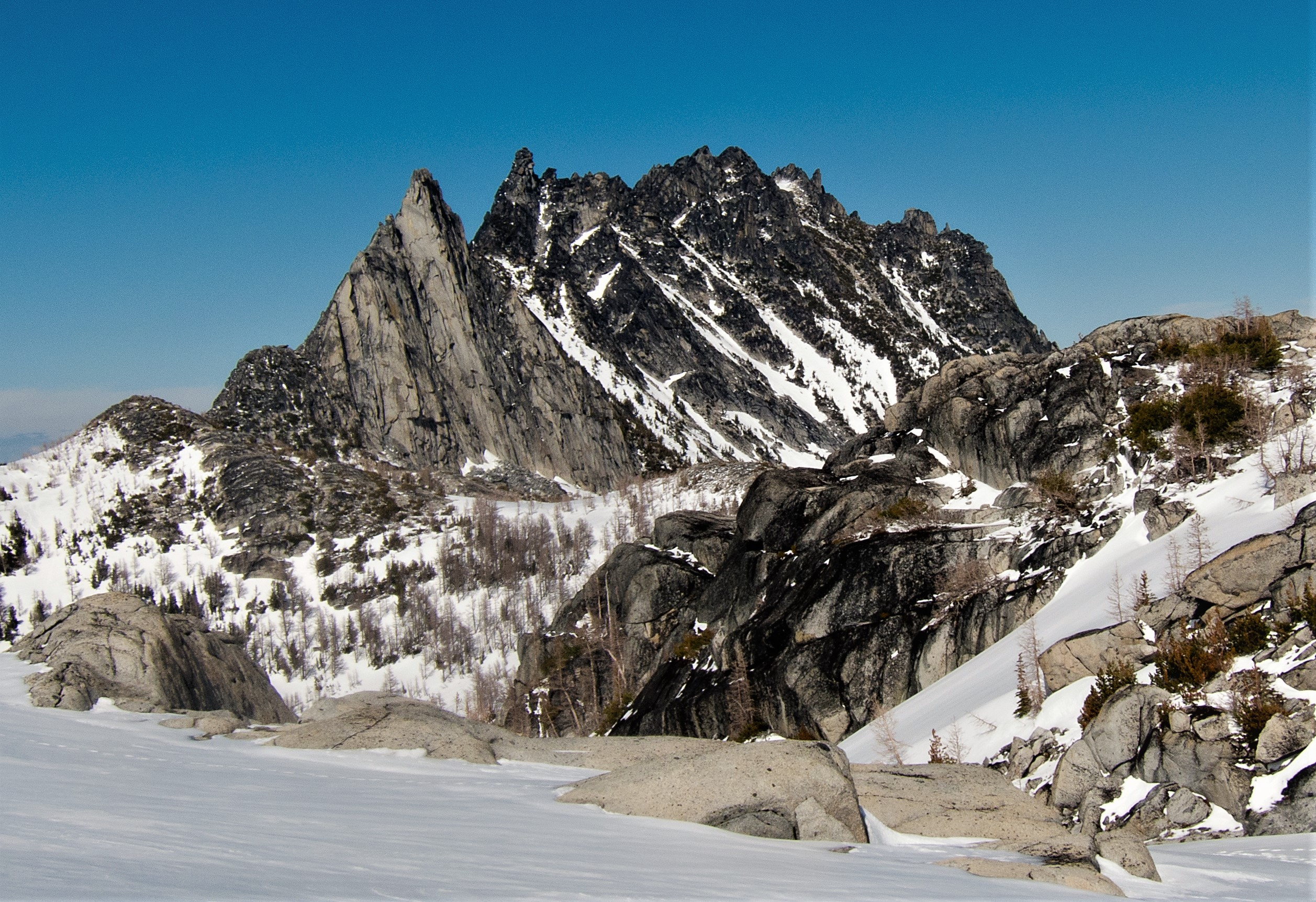
