= Dip Top Peak =

Mountain in Washington (state), United States

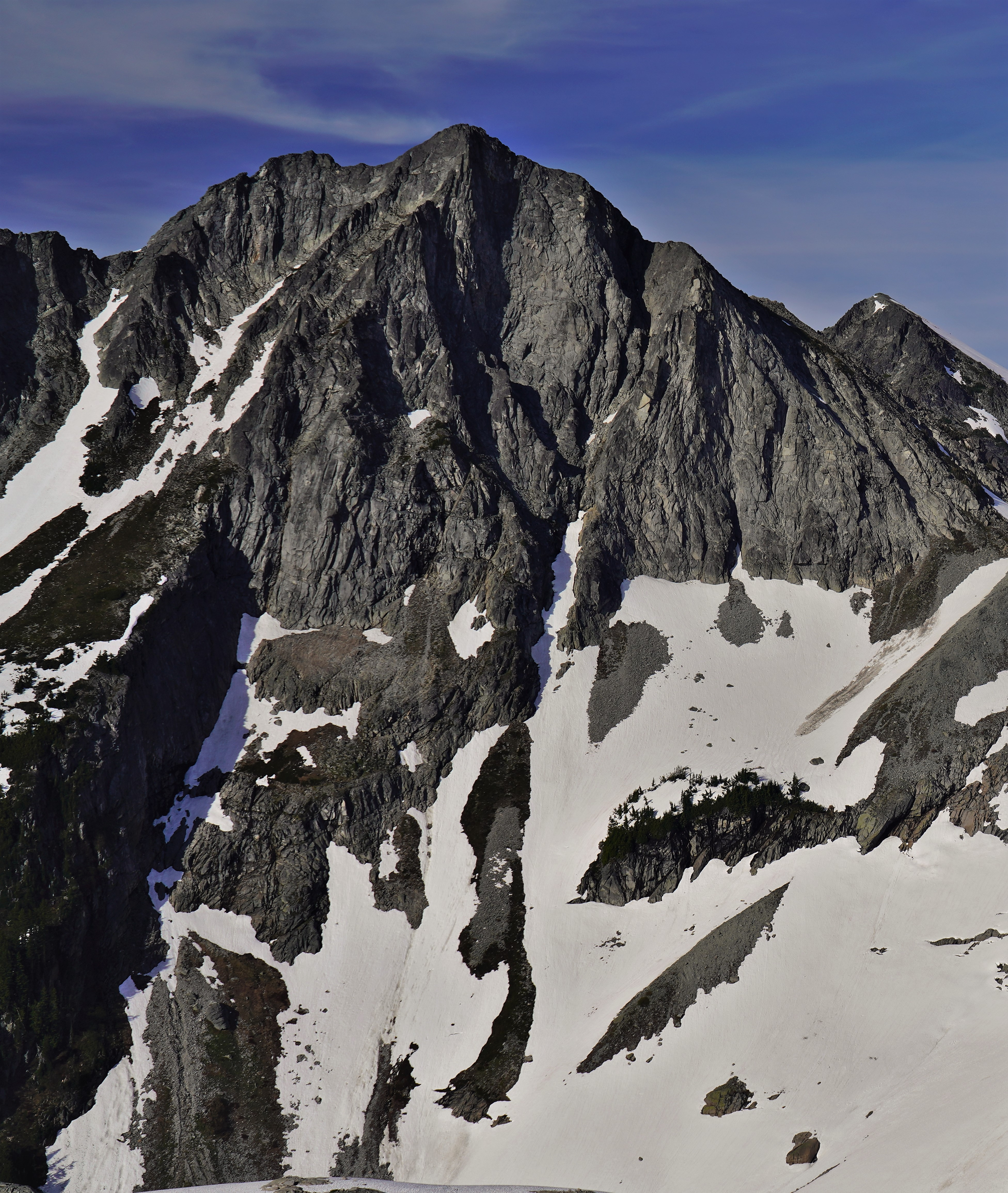
- Southwest aspect

Highest point
- Elevation: 7,291 ft (2,222 m)
- Prominence: 1,011 ft (308 m)
- Parent peak: Lynch Peak (7,300 ft)
- Isolation: 0.51 mi (0.82 km)
- Coordinates: 47°34′59″N 121°10′58″W

Geography
- Location within Washington (state) Location within the United States
- Country: United States
- State: Washington
- County: King
- Protected area: Alpine Lakes Wilderness
- Parent range: Cascade Range
- Topo map: USGS Mount Daniel

Climbing
- First ascent: 1950
- Easiest route: Scrambling

Dip Top Peak is a 7,291-foot-elevation (2,222-meter) mountain summit located in the Alpine Lakes Wilderness in eastern King County of Washington state. It is part of the Cascade Range and is set on land managed by Mount Baker-Snoqualmie National Forest. The peak is situated 1.25 mi (2.01 km) north of Mount Daniel, and less than one mile south of Jade Lake. Precipitation runoff from the mountain drains into East Fork Foss River, which is a tributary of the Skykomish River. The summit saddle has two rock horns, of which the higher southwest peak is the true summit. The first ascent was made August 1950 by Bill and Gene Prater. In the early 1970s, brothers Gene and Bill Prater created the modern aluminum snowshoe known today, and sold them via Bill's "Sherpa Snowshoes" company, which proved very popular.

== Geology ==
The Alpine Lakes Wilderness features some of the most rugged topography in the Cascade Range with craggy peaks and ridges, deep glacial valleys, and granite walls spotted with over 700 mountain lakes. Geological events occurring many years ago created the diverse topography and drastic elevation changes over the Cascade Range leading to various climate differences.

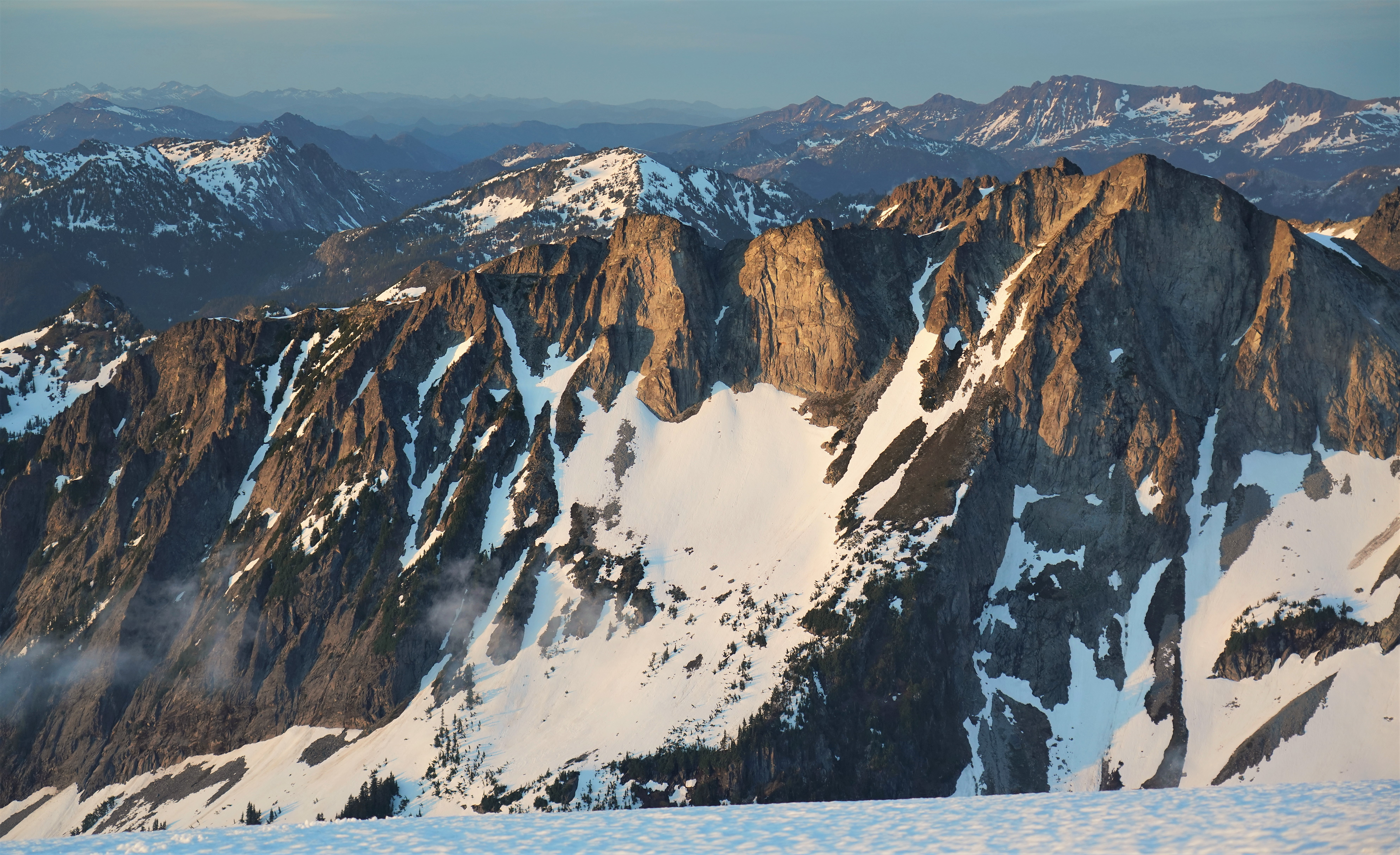
Alpenglow on Dip Top Peak

The history of the formation of the Cascade Mountains dates back millions of years ago to the late Eocene Epoch. With the North American Plate overriding the Pacific Plate, episodes of volcanic igneous activity persisted. Glacier Peak, a stratovolcano that is 36.7 mi (59.1 km) north of Dip Top Peak, began forming in the mid-Pleistocene. During the Pleistocene period dating back over two million years ago, glaciation advancing and retreating repeatedly scoured and shaped the landscape. The last glacial retreat in the Alpine Lakes area began about 14,000 years ago and was north of the Canada–US border by 10,000 years ago. The U-shaped cross section of the river valleys is a result of that recent glaciation. Uplift and faulting in combination with glaciation have been the dominant processes which have created the tall peaks and deep valleys of the Alpine Lakes Wilderness area.

== Climate ==
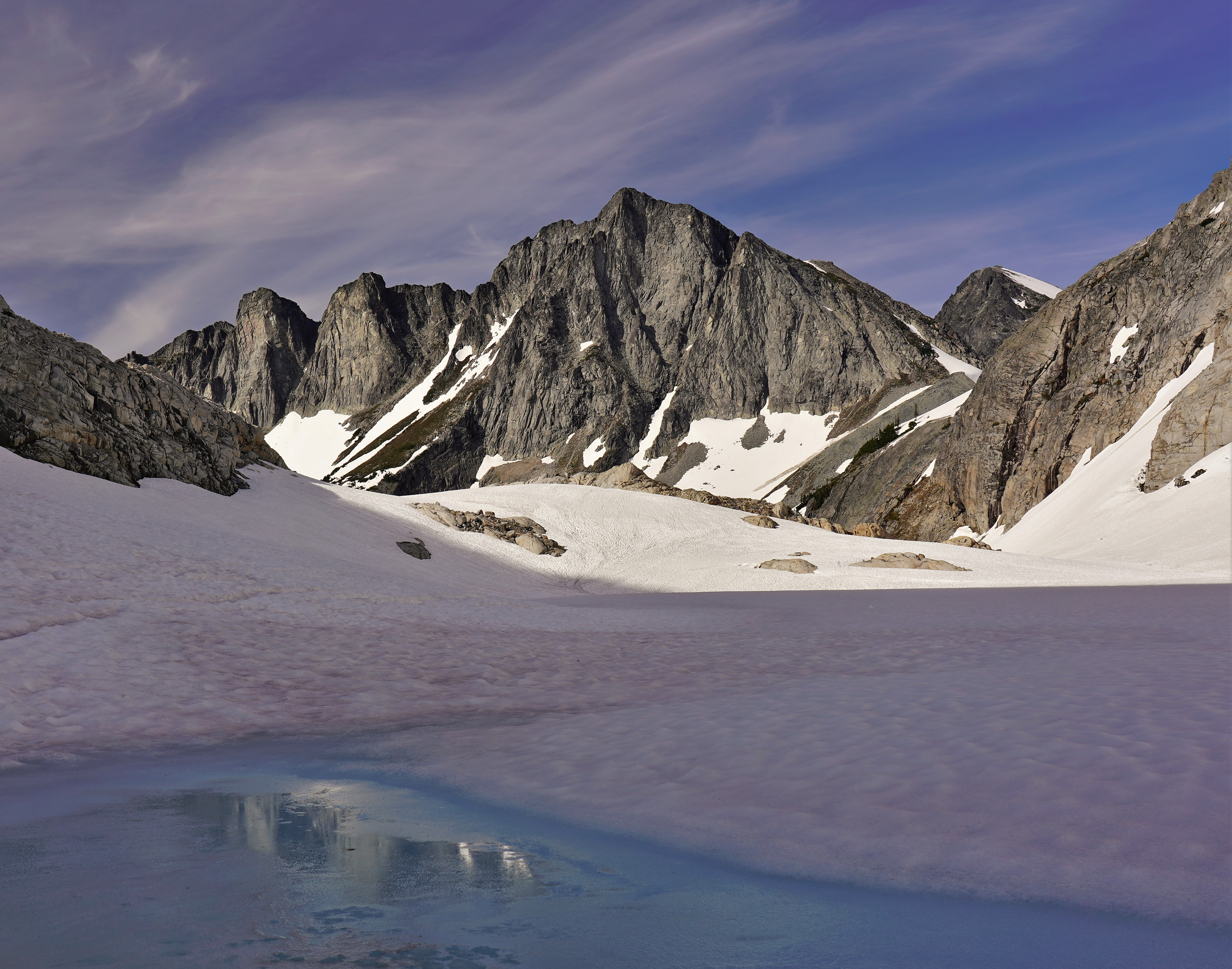
Dip Top Peak

Dip Top Peak is located in the marine west coast climate zone of western North America. Weather fronts originating in the Pacific Ocean travel northeast toward the Cascade Mountains. As fronts approach, they are forced upward by the peaks of the Cascade Range, causing them to drop their moisture in the form of rain or snow onto the Cascades (Orographic lift). As a result, the west side of the Cascades experiences high precipitation, especially during the winter months in the form of snowfall. Because of maritime influence, snow tends to be wet and heavy, resulting in avalanche danger. During winter months, weather is usually cloudy, but due to high pressure systems over the Pacific Ocean that intensify during summer months, there is often little or no cloud cover during the summer.

== See also ==
- List of peaks of the Alpine Lakes Wilderness
