= Wenatchee Mountains =

Mountain range in Chelan and Kittitas counties in Washington, United States

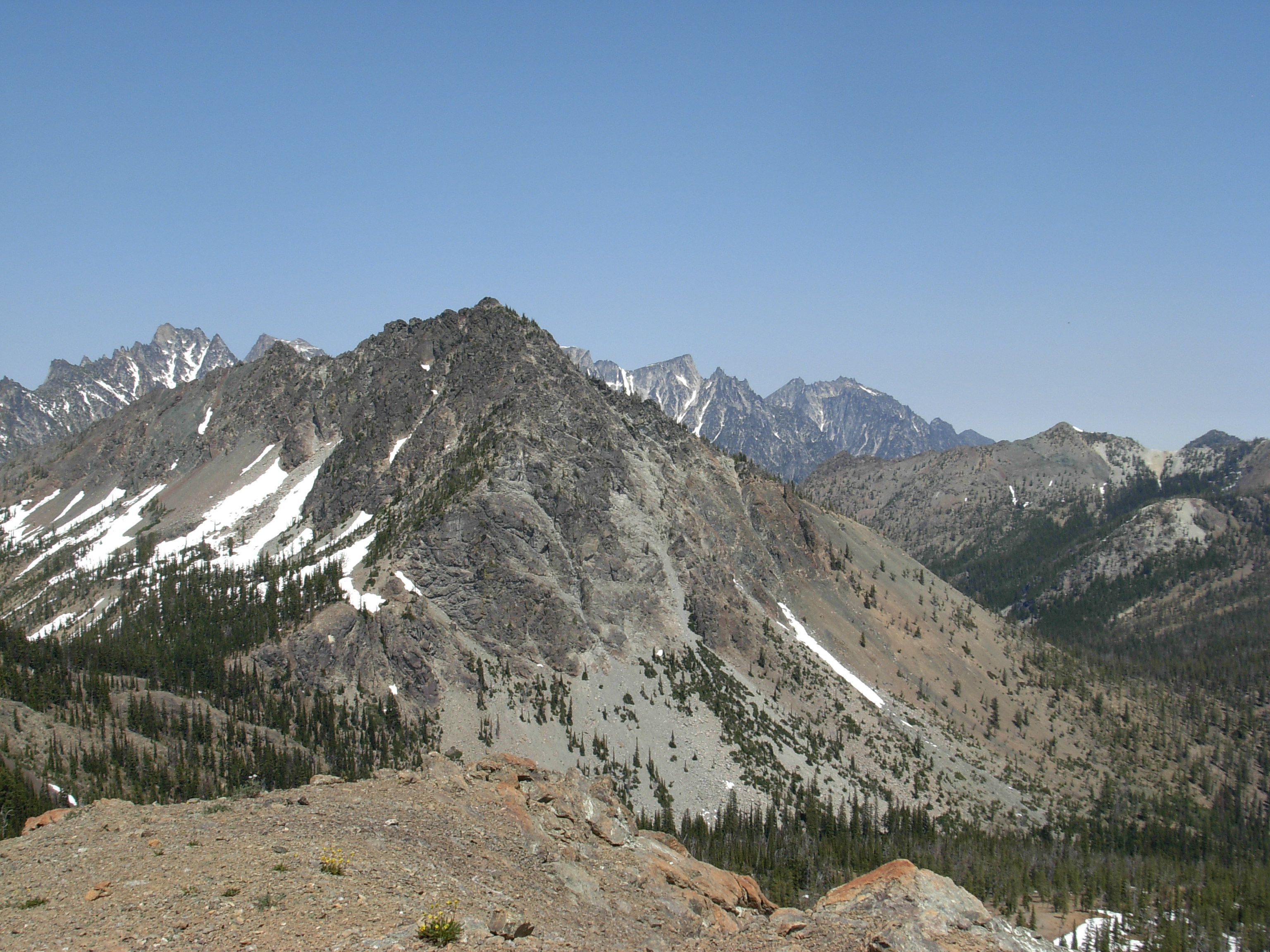
- Bills Peak in the Teanaway area

Highest point
- Peak: Mount Stuart
- Elevation: 9,415 ft (2,870 m)
- Coordinates: 47°28′30.5″N 120°54′08.6″W

Dimensions
- Length: 50 mi (80 km) east-west

Geography
- Location within Washington (state)
- Country: United States
- State: Washington
- Counties: Chelan; Kittitas
- Parent range: Cascade Range

The Wenatchee Mountains are a range of mountains in central Washington State in the United States of America. A major subrange of the Cascade Range, extending east 50 miles (80 km) from the Cascade crest, the Wenatchee Mountains separate the drainage basins of the Yakima and the Wenatchee rivers. The crest of the range forms part of the boundary between Chelan and Kittitas counties.

== Extent ==
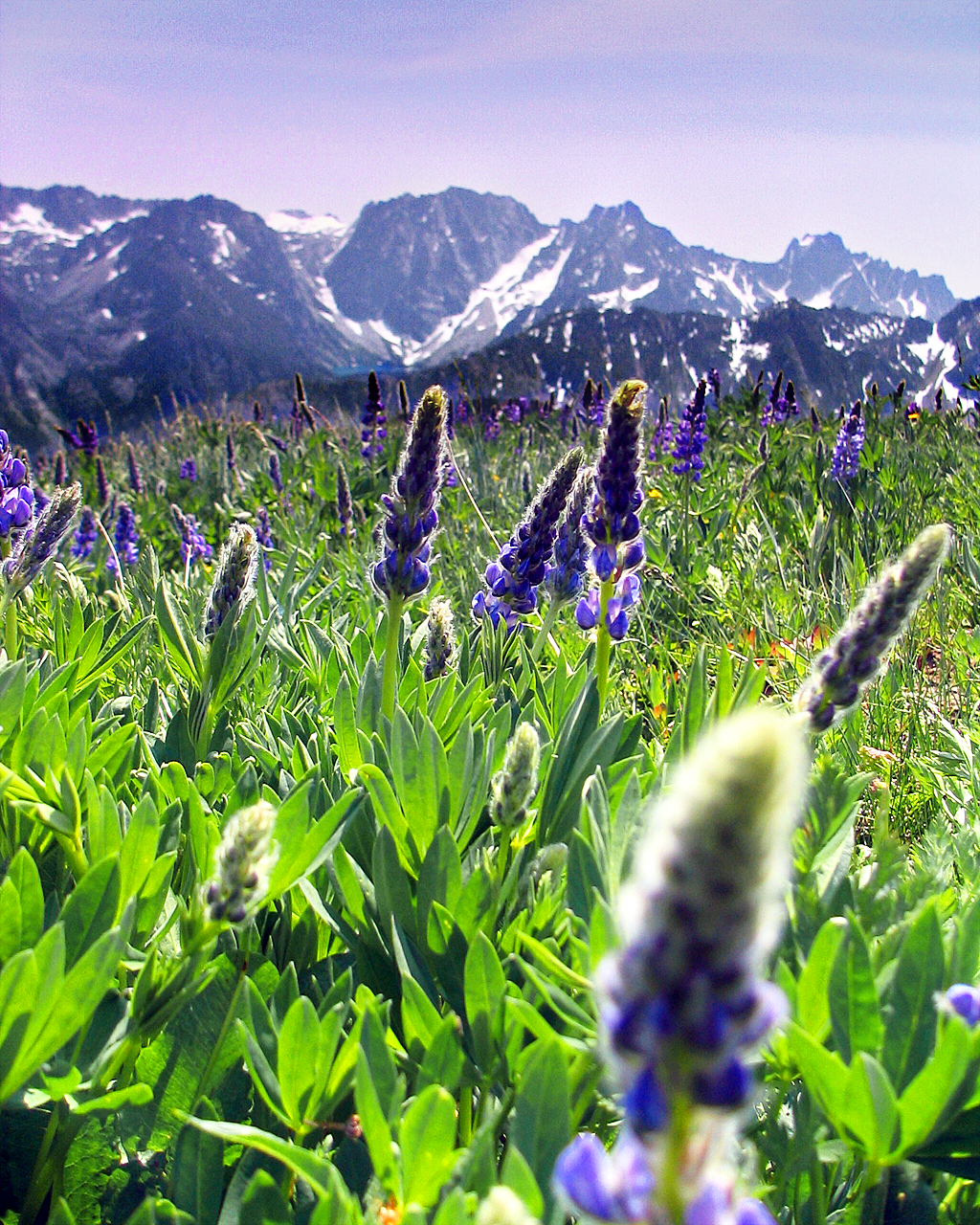
Dragontail Peak from a meadow on Cashmere Mountain

Fred Beckey describes the Wenatchee Mountains as the area between the Wenatchee and Yakima rivers and Stevens Pass. Among the range's significant features he describes are Mount Stuart, the second highest non-volcanic peak in Washington and one of the largest single granitic mountains in the United States, the Cashmere Crags, the Lost World Plateau, Edward Plateau, and Dragontail Plateau, the Enchantment Lakes Basin ("one of the most marvelous examples of an ice-sculpted wilderness in the Cascade Range″), Icicle Creek and its narrow, U-shaped valley over 6,000 feet (1,800 m) deep, one of the deepest in the Cascades, and the Wenatchee River's unusual winding Tumwater Canyon gorge.

According to Peakbagger.com the Wenatchee Mountains are defined as bounded by U.S. Route 2 from Stevens Pass to Wenatchee on the Columbia River, then down the Columbia River to Interstate 90, then west along the highway to the vicinity of Cle Elum and Roslyn, then north along Cle Elum Lake and the Cle Elum River and north to Stevens Pass. Subranges of the Wenatchee Mountains and their highest peaks as defined by Peakbagger.com are the Chiwaukum Mountains (Big Chiwaukum Mountain, 8,501 feet (2,591 m)), North Wenatchee Mountains (Cashmere Mountain, 8,501 feet (2,591 m)), Stuart Range (Mount Stuart, 9,415 feet (2,870 m)), the Teanaway Area (Ingalls Peak, 7,662 feet (2,335 m)), and the Mission-Naneum Ridges (Mission Peak, 6,876 feet (2,096 m)). Peakbagger.com also defines and names the mountain regions bordering the Wenatchee Mountains. These are the Alpine Lakes Area to the west, South Cascade Crest to the south, Glacier Peak-North Stevens Pass area to the northwest, and the Entiat Mountains to the northeast.

The USGS GNIS defines the range with a simple list seven points in a line, running from approximately Paddy-Go-Easy Pass and Granite Mountain to approximately Blewett Pass and Naneum Creek.

== Major peaks ==
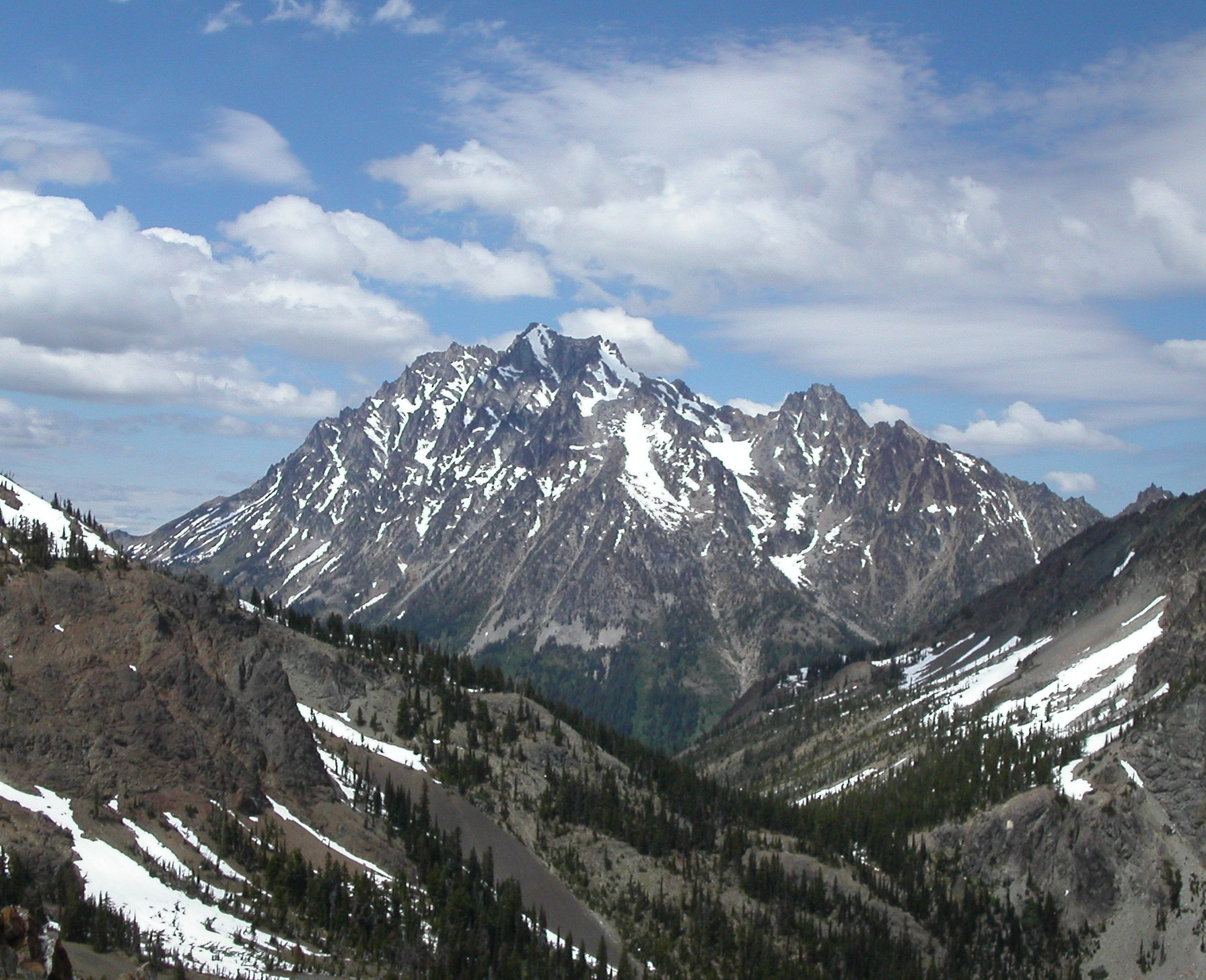
Mount Stuart from the south

Partial list of peaks:

- Mount Stuart - 9,415 feet (2,870 m) -
- Dragontail Peak - 8,809 feet (2,685 m) -
- Colchuck Peak - 8,507 feet (2,593 m) -
- Cannon Mountain - 8,579 feet (2,615 m) -
- Sherpa Peak - 8,478 feet (2,584 m) -
- Enchantment Peak - 8,520 feet (2,600 m) -
- Witches Tower - 8,520 feet (2,600 m) -
- Cashmere Mountain - 8,448 feet (2,575 m) -
- Argonaut Peak - 8,369 feet (2,551 m) -
- Little Annapurna - 8,458 feet (2,578 m) -
- McClellan Peak - 8,225 feet (2,507 m) -
- Eightmile Mountain - 7,864 feet (2,397 m) -
- The Cradle - 7,231 feet (2,204 m) -
- Hawkins Mountain - 7,160 feet (2,180 m) -
- Granite Mountain - 7,064 feet (2,153 m) -
- Earl Peak - 7,018 feet (2,139 m) -
- Mac Peak - 6,837 feet (2,084 m) -
- Three Brothers - 7,303 feet (2,226 m) -
- Thunder Mountain Lakes Peak - 6,711 feet (2,046 m)
- Trico Mountain - 6,604 feet (2,013 m) -
- Thunder Mountain - 6,407 feet (1,953 m) -
- Slippery Slab Tower - 6,356 feet (1,937 m) -

== Natural history ==
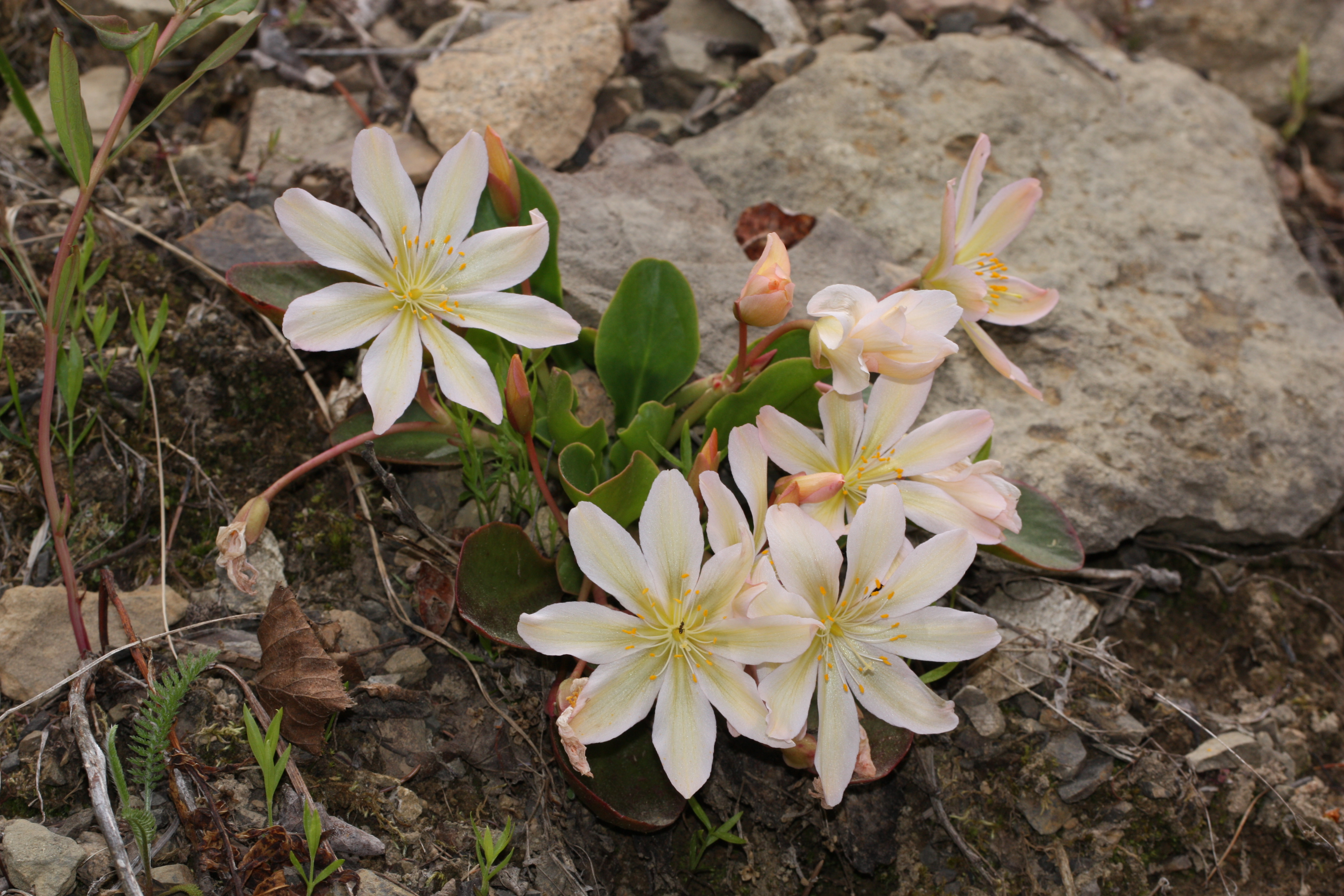
Lewisiopsis tweedyi on Tronsen Ridge, Wenatchee Mountains

The Wenatchee Mountains are in the rain shadow of the main Cascade Range and hence are drier and have fewer trees. This comparative lack of trees offers good wildflower displays and wide views. Serpentine soils are found within the Wenatchee Mountains, modifying the plant communities in those areas.

The Wenatchee Mountains are home to a number of rare, endemic, or disjunct plant species, including Androsace nivalis var. dentata, Claytonia megarhiza var. nivalis, Delphinium viridescens, Lewisiopsis tweedyi, Trifolium thompsonii, and Valeriana columbiana. The Wenatchee Mountains checkermallow (Sidalcea oregano var. calva) occurs only along Peshastin Creek, south of Leavenworth, Washington. It is the rarest plant in Washington, and is now on the endangered species list.

== See also ==
- Albert Hale Sylvester
- List of mountain ranges in Washington
