= Icicle Creek =

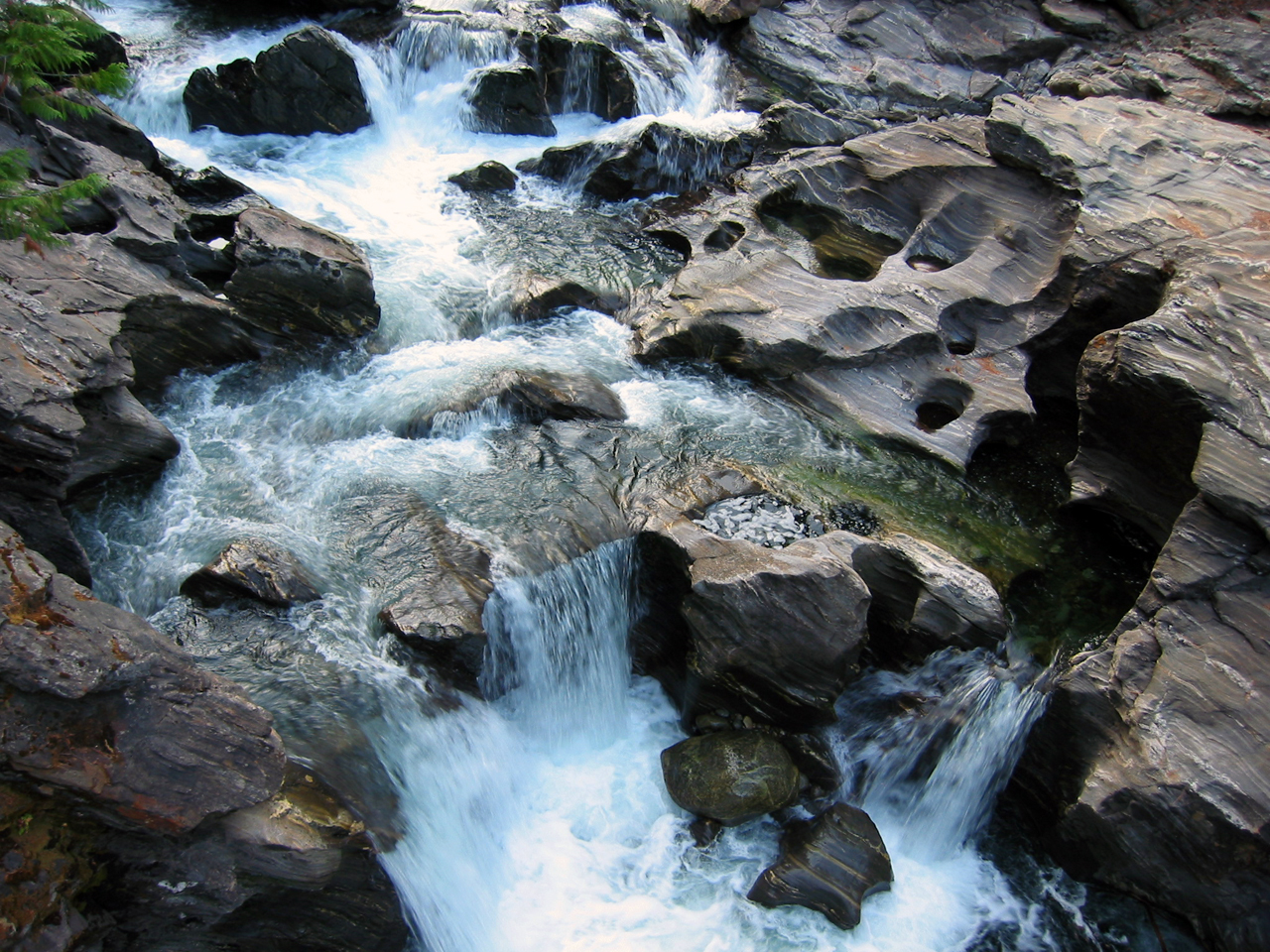
- Rapids on Icicle Creek

- Location of the mouth of Icicle Creek in Washington Icicle Creek (the United States)
- Native name: na-sik-elt (Columbia-Wenatchi), meaning narrow canyon.

Location
- Country: United States
- State: Washington
- County: Chelan

Physical characteristics
- Source: Cascade Range
  - coordinates: 47°43′7″N 121°3′3″W
  - elevation: 4,681 ft (1,427 m)
- Mouth: Wenatchee River
  - coordinates: 47°34′48″N 120°39′57″W
- Length: 31.8 mi (51.2 km)
- Basin size: 212.7 sq mi (551 km^{2})
- Discharge
  - location: river mile 5.8
  - average: 614 cu ft/s (17.4 m^{3}/s)
  - minimum: 44 cu ft/s (1.2 m^{3}/s)
  - maximum: 19,800 cu ft/s (560 m^{3}/s)

Icicle Creek is a non navigable stream in the U.S. state of Washington. It originates at Josephine Lake near the crest of the Cascade Range and flows generally east to join the Wenatchee River near Leavenworth. Icicle Creek's drainage basin is mountainous and mostly undeveloped land within the Wenatchee National Forest and the Alpine Lakes Wilderness. The final 6 miles (10 km) of the creek are moderately developed with scattered homes and pasture, a golf course, children's camp, a small housing development called Icicle Island Club, and the Leavenworth National Fish Hatchery. Some water is diverted from the creek for municipal use by the City of Leavenworth at Icicle Creek river mile 5.6. Near Leavenworth, the wheelchair-accessible Icicle Creek Nature Trail, a National Recreation Trail designated in 2005, runs 1.0 mile (1.6 km) along a historic creek channel.

Icicle Creek's name comes from the Indian word na-sik-elt, meaning narrow canyon. According to Albert H. Sylvester, topographer and Forest Service surveyor for many years, "Place the letter n at the beginning of icicle and the letter t at its end, and you practically have the Indian word." Original patents was Northern Pacific Railroad patent number #32, Joseph Scott patent number #907, and George Briskey patent number #516.

== Course ==
Icicle Creek begins as the outlet of Josephine Lake, less than a mile from the crest of the Cascade Range and the headwaters of Tunnel Creek, a tributary of the west-flowing Skykomish River. Stevens Pass is a few miles north of the lake. The Pacific Crest Trail passes along the lake's western side. Josephine Lake's altitude is 4,681 feet (1,427 m). Icicle Creek flows south from the lake through a deep and narrow valley. After a few miles it turns southeast and its valley takes on a classic glacier-carved U-shape. Icicle Creek begins to turn more directly south near river mile 22, just after Spanish Camp Creek joins from the northeast. Spanish Camp Creek and its headwater tributaries drain the high alpine western side of Icicle Ridge from Grindstone Mountain to Cape Horn and Ladies Pass.

Shortly below the Spanish Camp Creek confluence Icicle Creek is joined by French Creek from the west. French Creek is one of the main tributaries of Icicle Creek. It flows for miles through a deep U-shaped valley. Its many tributaries drain a number of peaks and ridges along the crest of the Wenatchee Mountains, including Granite Mountain, The Cradle, and Highchair Mountain. Near the end of French Creek's valley is Paddy-Go-Easy Pass, which leads to the Cle Elum River valley. Below the French Creek confluence Icicle Creek leaves the Alpine Lake Wilderness and is soon after joined from the south by Black Pine Creek, which enters Icicle Creek river mile 20. Black Pine Campground is located near the confluence. Boggy Creek joins from the north near the Rock Island Campground. About a mile below that Icicle Creek is joined from the south by Jack Creek, another major tributary. Like French Creek, Jack Creek flows through a long, deep U-shaped valley, draining a portion of the crest of the Wenatchee Mountains. Jack Creek originates in several headwater streams draining a high alpine region near Stuart Pass, Ingalls Peak, and Mount Stuart.

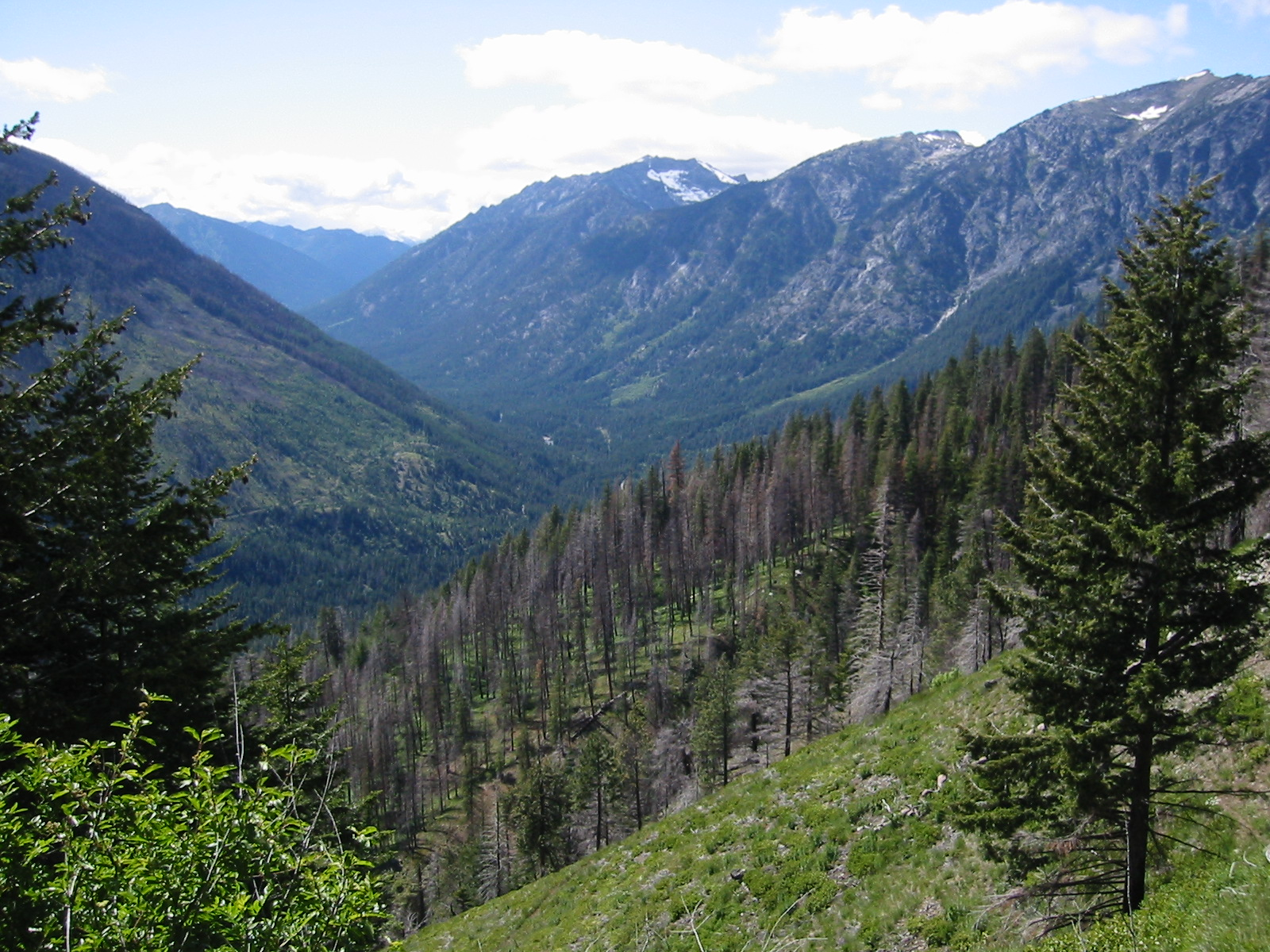
Icicle Creek passes between the north ridge of Cashmere Mountain (left) and Icicle Ridge (right) in this view east from Fourth of July Creek

Below Jack Creek Icicle Creek is joined from the north by Chatter Creek. Chatter Creek Campground is located on the north side of Icicle Creek near the mouth of Chatter Creek. Several tributaries join below Chatter Creek, such as Hoxsey, Bob, Doctor, Ida, Big Slide, Jay, Johnny, and Victoria creeks. Eponymous campgrounds are located at the Ida and Johnny Creek confluences. A number of small streams join below Victoria Creek, such as Fourth of July Creek. Bridge Creek joins from the north at Bridge Creek Campground.

At river mile 8 Icicle Creek is joined by Eightmile Creek, a larger tributary. Eightmile Creek and its tributaries Mountaineer Creek and Pioneer Creek drain a large area to the southwest, reaching to the crest of the Wenatchee Mountains. There are a number of lakes in the Eightmile Creek basin, including Eightmile Lake, Lake Caroline, Colchuck Lake, Lake Stuart, Jack Lake, and Horseshoe Lake. Major mountains drained include Mount Stuart, Sherpa Peak, Argonaut Peak, Colchuck Peak, and Dragontail Peak. These peaks are among the highest in the Wenatchee Mountains. Mount Stuart is the second-highest non-volcanic peak in Washington. These high mountains are known as the Stuart Range. The range contains a number of glaciers, notably Colchuck Glacier, Sherpa Glacier, and Stuart Glacier. Eightmile Campground is located on Icicle Creek just below the mouth of Eightmile Creek.

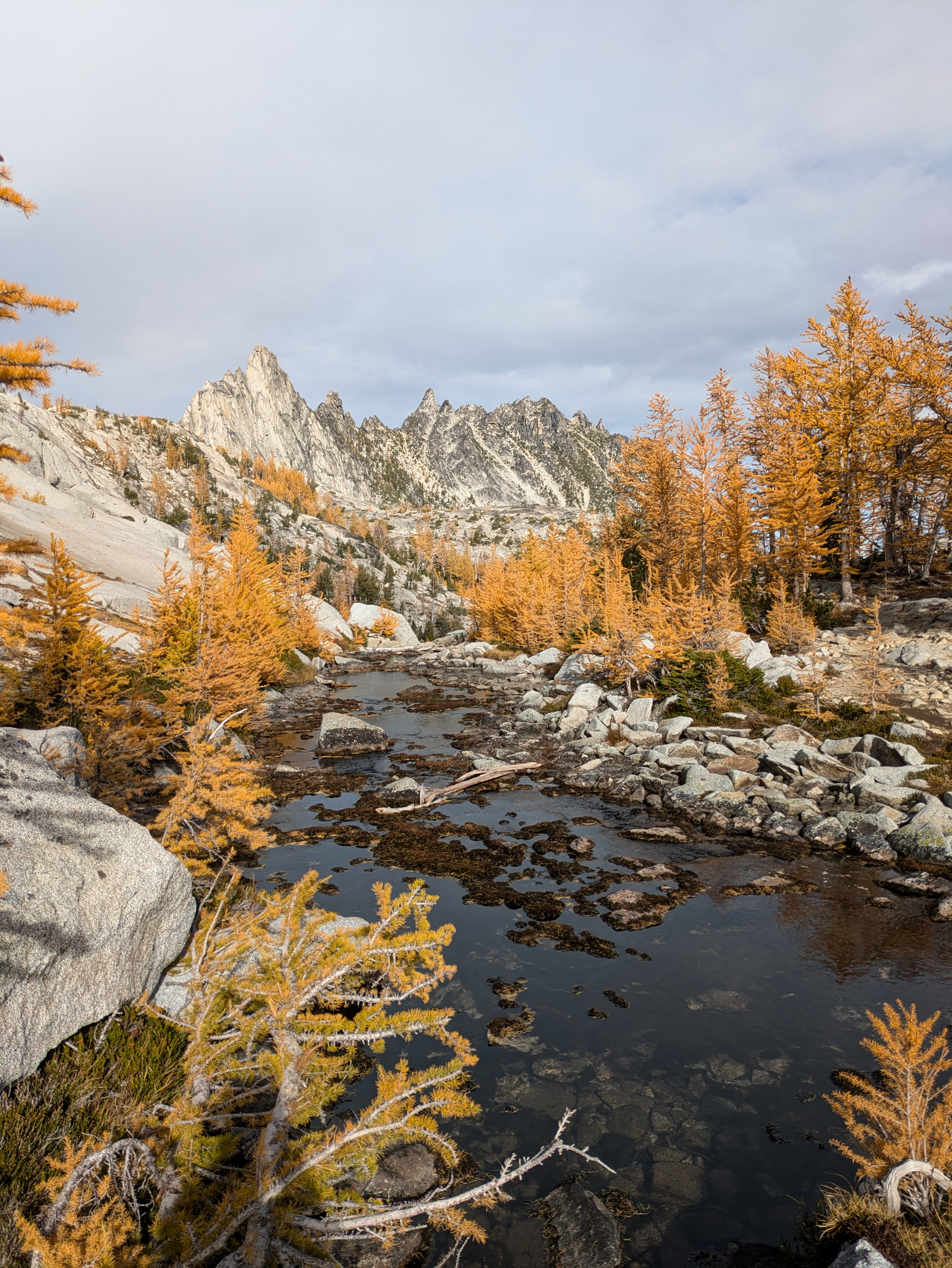
Snow Creek with Prusik Peak in the background, high in the Enchantments (11 October 2024)

Below Eightmile Creek Icicle Creek is joined from the south by Rat Creek, which flows from Coney Lake on the northern slopes of Cannon Mountain, Enchantment Peaks, Prusik Peak, and Shield Lake on the northern skirt of The Temple. There are numerous mountain lakes in this region. Just above river mile 5 Icicle Creek is joined from the south by Snow Creek, a notable tributary. Snow Creek flows from the heart of The Enchantments region of high alpine lakes between Enchantment Peaks and the Stuart Range.

Below Snow Creek Icicle Creek exits the Wenatchee National Forest and enters a semi-developed area near Leavenworth. Its valley broadens and the creek meanders widely. It passes the Leavenworth National Fish Hatchery and a number of scattered houses before emptying into the Wenatchee River about a mile south of Leavenworth.

== Natural history ==
According to monitoring data collected in 1993, Washington State Department of Ecology determined that the water quality of Icicle Creek was good and "met or exceeded expectations and is of lowest concern."

== Tributaries ==
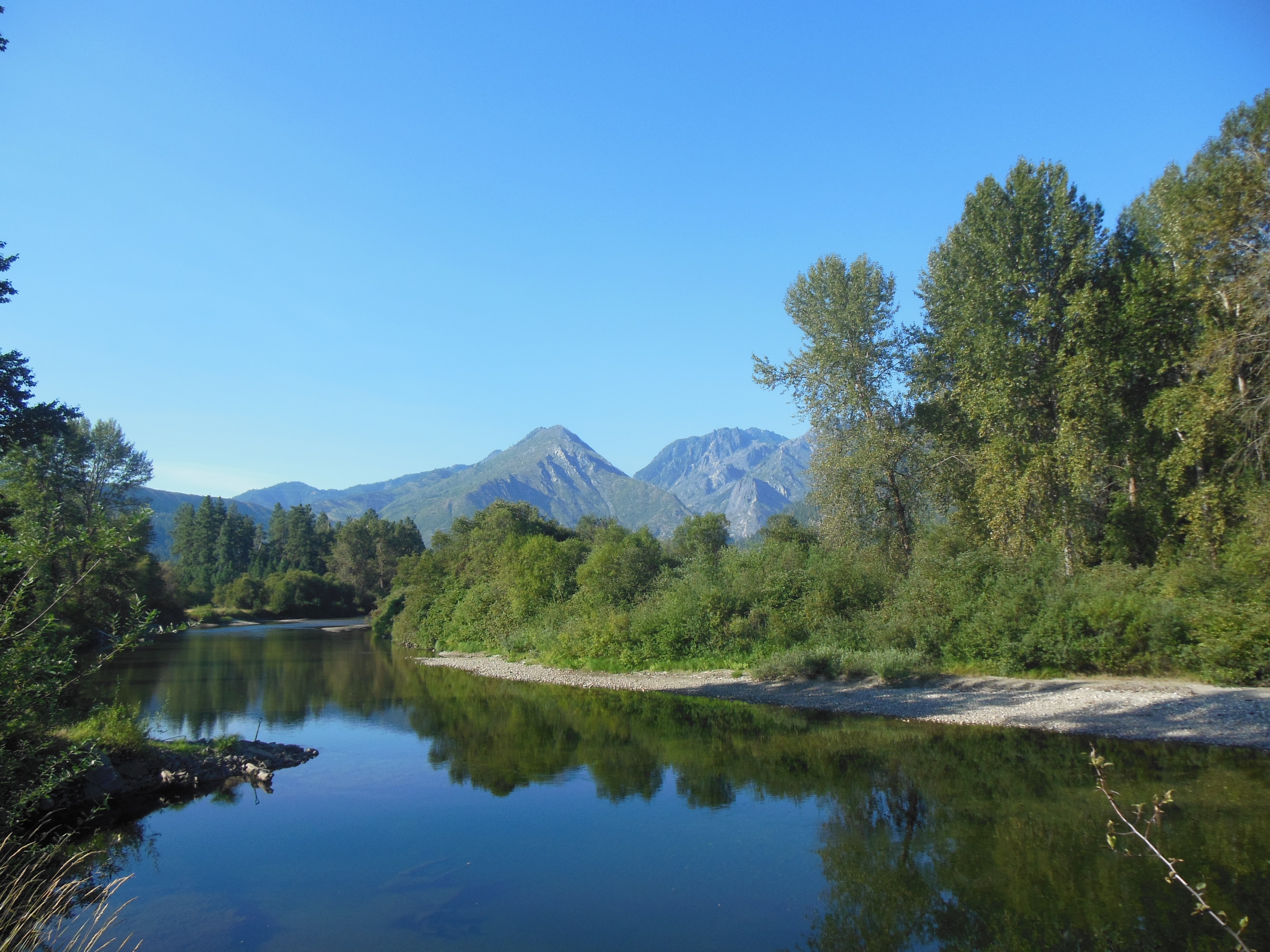
The creek near its mouth, looking upstream

From down to upstream, hierarchically listed, not exhaustive:

- Snow Creek
  - Toketie Creek
- Rat Creek
- Lion Creek
- Eightmile Creek
  - Mountaineer Creek
  - Pioneer Creek
- Bridge Creek
- Fourth of July Creek
- Mac Creek
- Victoria Creek
- Johnny Creek
- Jay Creek
- Big Slide Creek
- Ida Creek
- Doctor Creek
- Bob Creek
- Hoxsey Creek
- Chatter Creek
- Trout Creek
- Jack Creek
  - Meadow Creek
  - Van Epps Creek
- Boggy Creek
- Grindstone Creek
- Black Pine Creek
- French Creek
  - Snowall Creek
- Spanish Camp Creek
- Frosty Creek
- Doughgod Creek
- Cuitin Creek
- Leland Creek
  - Prospect Creek
- Chain Creek
- Trapper Creek
  - Basin Creek

== See also ==
- List of rivers of Washington (state)
