= Shield Lake =

Lake in Washington, United States

- Location within Washington (state) Location within the United States
- Location: Chelan County, Washington, United States
- Coordinates: 47.49697°N 120.78067°W
- Primary outflows: Rat Creek
- Basin countries: United States
- Surface area: 35.8 acres (14.5 ha)
- Surface elevation: 6,699 ft (2,042 m)

Shield Lake is a small alpine lake located in the Enchantments region of the Alpine Lakes Wilderness in Chelan County, Washington. Shield Lake sits in a bowl formed by a rocky cliff bifurcation of the east skirt of Cannon Mountain that connects to Elf Ridge Peak. Shield Lake has an outflow that is the inflow of Earle Lake and Mesa Lake less than a mile Northeast towards Rat Creek. The creek joins the outflow of Coney Lake, a tributary of Icicle Creek. Coney Lake is situated over the opposite side over Elf Ridge. The lake is home to cutthroat trout and other fish.

== See also ==
- List of lakes of the Alpine Lakes Wilderness
