= Josephine Lake =

- Location within Washington (state) Location within the United States
- Location: Chelan County, Washington, U.S.
- Coordinates: 47.719°N 121.0571°W
- Type: natural lake, reservoir
- Primary outflows: Icicle Creek
- Basin countries: United States
- Surface area: 22.5 acres (0.091 km^{2})
- Surface elevation: 4,685 feet (1,428 m)

Josephine Lake is a natural lake and reservoir near Stevens Pass in Chelan County, Washington, United States. At the south skirt of Big Chief Mountain, Josephine Lake is the source of the Icicle Creek. Because Josephine Lake is at the heart of the Alpine Lakes Wilderness, the lake is a popular area for hiking, swimming, and fishing golden trout.

== Location ==
Josephine Lake is located approximately 5 miles southeast of Stevens Pass along the Pacific Crest Trail. Lake Susan Jane, the source of Mill Creek, is a short distance north along the Pacific Crest Trail and Swimming Deer Lake to the south along the trail.

== Outflow ==
Icicle Creek is the outlet of Josephine Lake, less than a mile from the crest of the Cascade Range and the headwaters of Tunnel Creek, a tributary of the west-flowing Skykomish River. Josephine Lake's altitude is 4,685 feet (1,428 m). Icicle Creek flows south from the lake through a deep and narrow granite valley. After a few miles it turns southeast and its gorge broadens into a classic glacier-carved U-shape.

Josephine Lake's cold waters flowing into Icicle Creek are critical for fish and wildlife within Icicle Canyon, the easternmost gateway of the Alpine Lakes Wilderness.

== Name ==
Along with neighboring lakes, Josephine Lake was given its name by Albert Hale Sylvester, a topographer for the United States Geological Survey working throughout the North Cascades National Park Complex in the 1900s. The name is purported to be from Josephine Williams, wife of a ranger from Sylvester's district office.

== See also ==
- List of lakes of the Alpine Lakes Wilderness
