= Argonaut Peak =

Mountain in Washington (state), United States

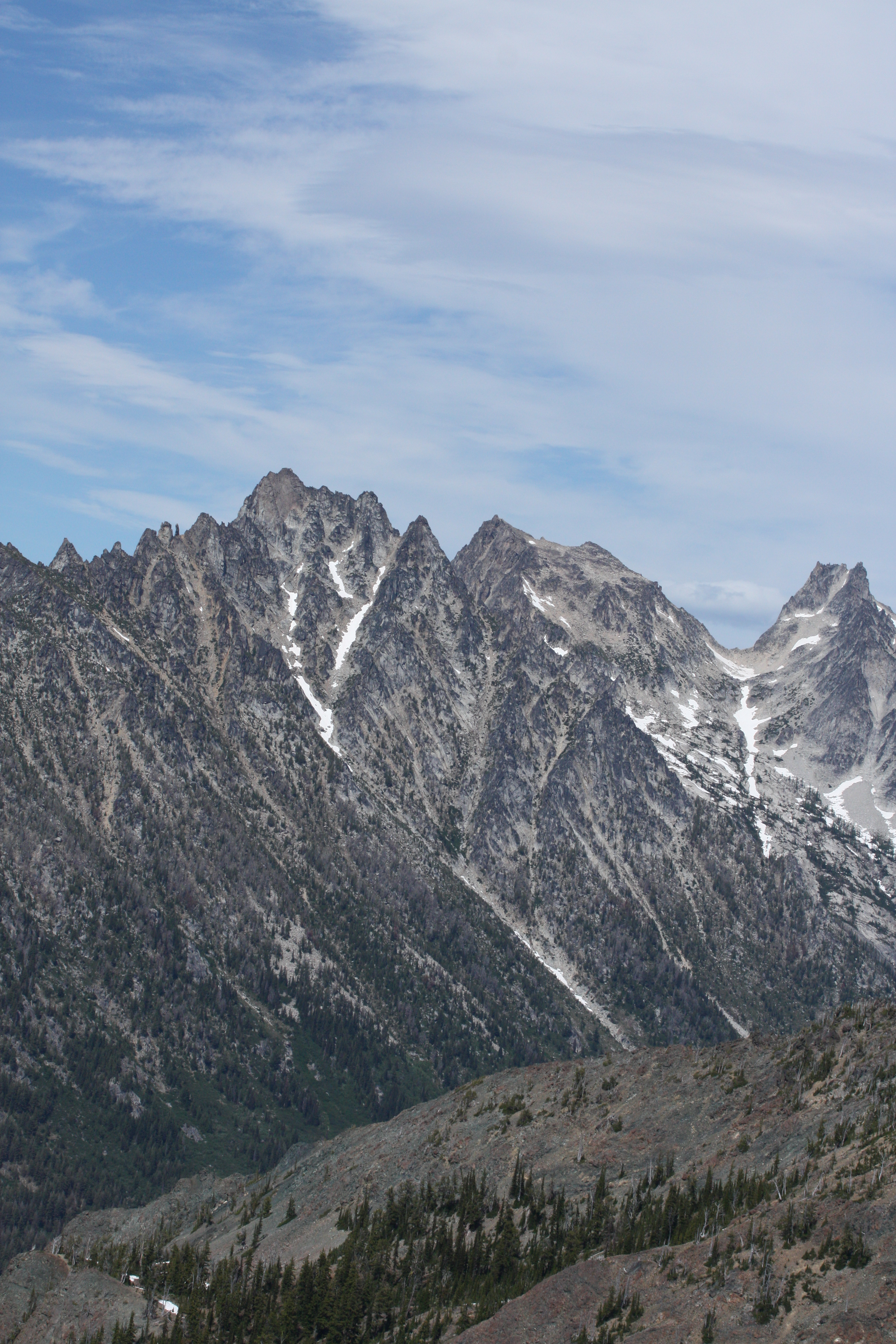
- Argonaut Peak from the southwest

Highest point
- Elevation: 8,457 ft (2,578 m) NAVD 88
- Prominence: 733 ft (223 m)
- Coordinates: 47°28′12″N 120°51′41″W

Geography
- Location within Washington (state)
- Location: Chelan County; Washington, United States
- Parent range: Cascade Range

Geology
- Mountain type: granite

Climbing
- First ascent: Lex Maxwell, Bob McCall, and Bill Prater in 1955

Argonaut Peak is a tall mountain in the Cascade Range in the U.S. state of Washington. Part of the Stuart Range part of the Wenatchee subrange of the Cascades, it is within the Alpine Lakes Wilderness of the Wenatchee National Forest and part of the region known as The Enchantments. At 8,453 feet (2,576 m) in elevation it is the 65th highest peak in Washington. Located on the crest between Colchuck Peak and Sherpa Peak, Argonaut Peak has a southeast and a west summit of almost identical height, with the west being the true summit. There is a prominent southeast spire. Its southern side slopes down to the valley of Ingalls Creek. The north and northeast sides of Argonaut stand high above a branch of Mountaineer Creek, a tributary of Icicle Creek. Argonaut Peak is 1.7 miles (2.7 km) west of Isolation Lake and 1.8 miles (2.9 km) east of Mount Stuart.

== Geology ==
Argonaut Peak is a large bastion of clean granite rock, part of the Mount Stuart batholith.

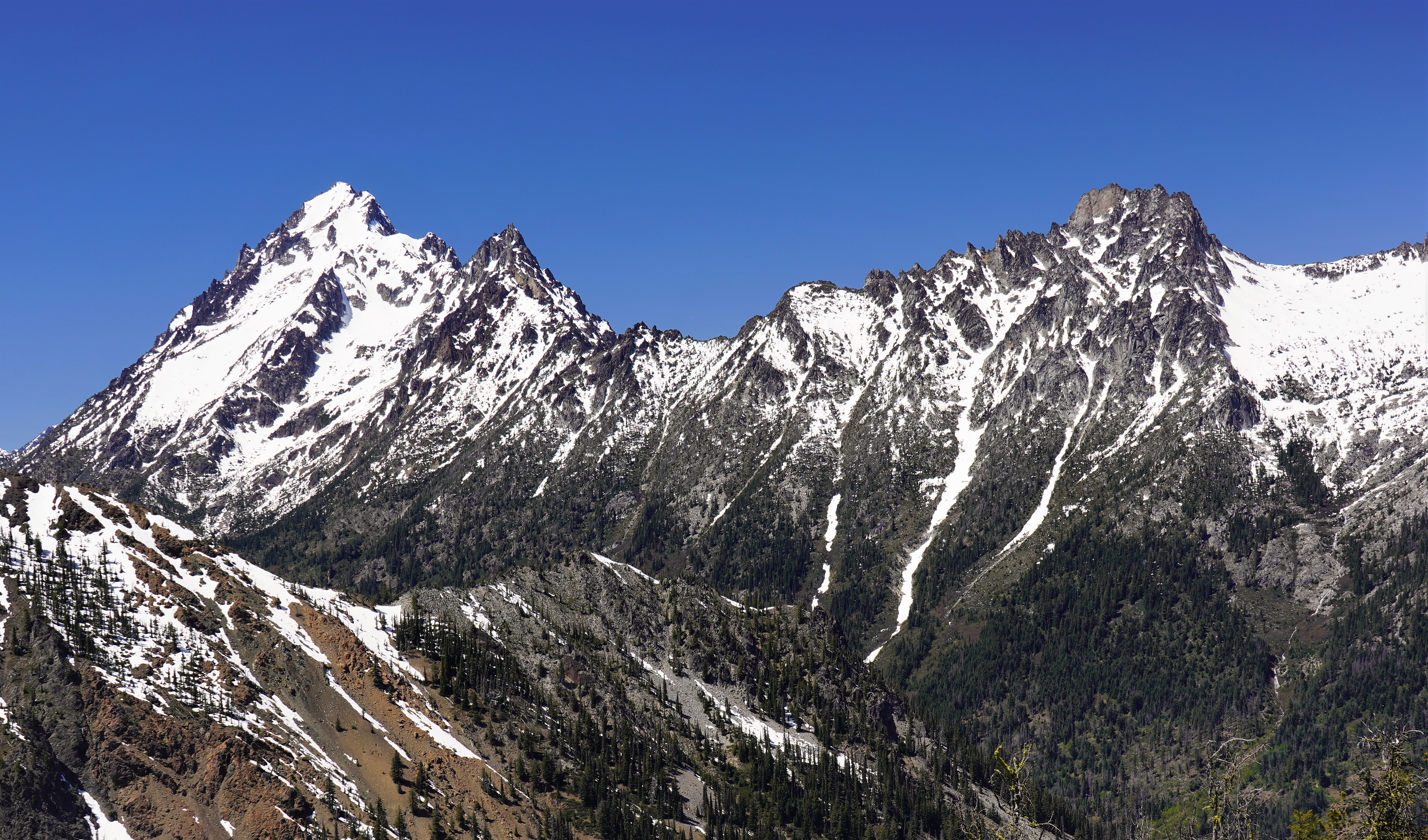
Mt. Stuart and Sherpa Peak (left), Argonaut Peak on the right

== History ==
Argonaut Peak was first summited, via the south route, in September 1955 by Lex Maxwell, Bob McCall, and Bill Prater.

== See also ==
- List of mountains of the United States
- List of mountains by elevation

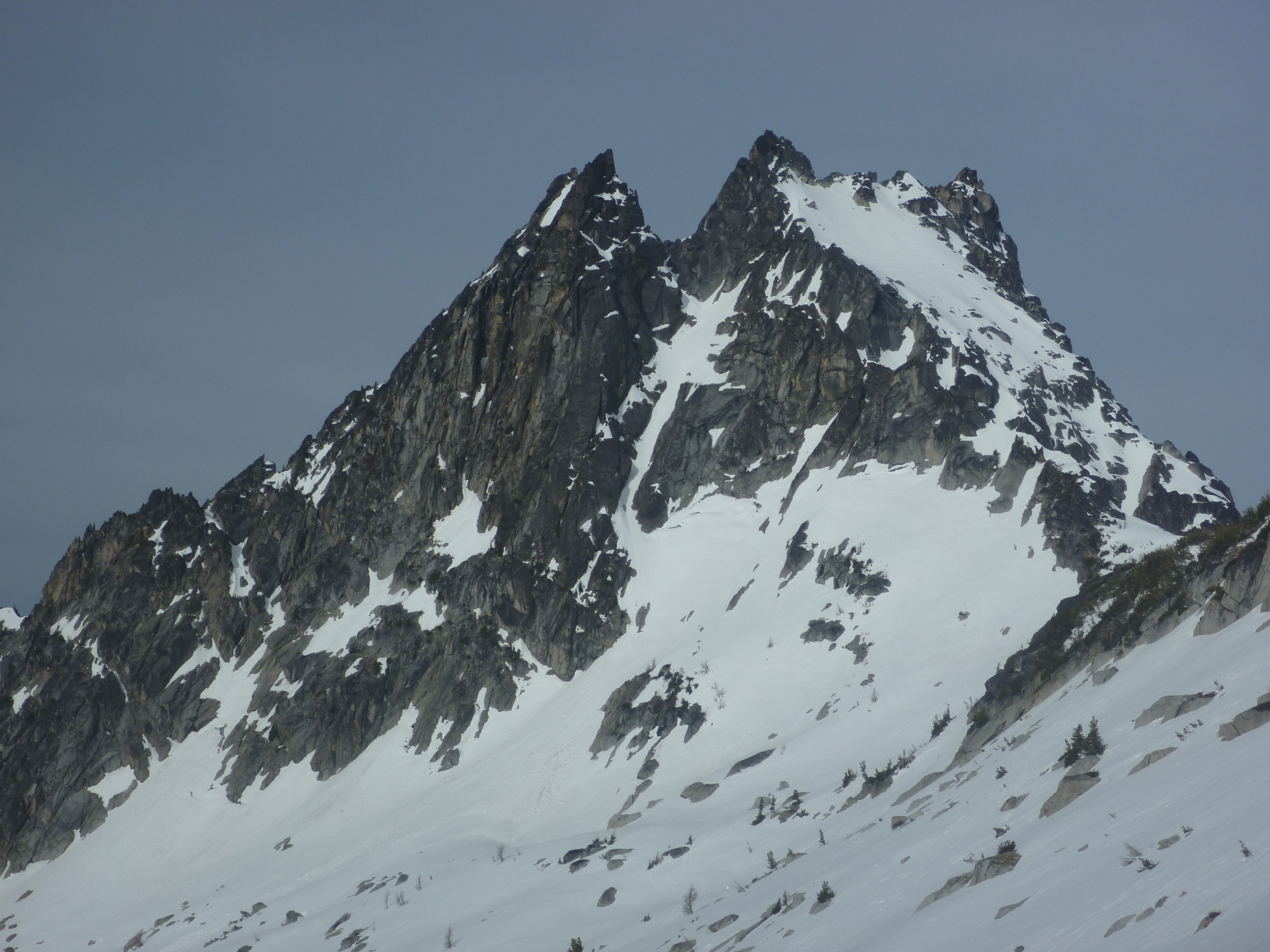
Argonaut Peak from the east
