= Colchuck Glacier =

Glacier in Washington, United States

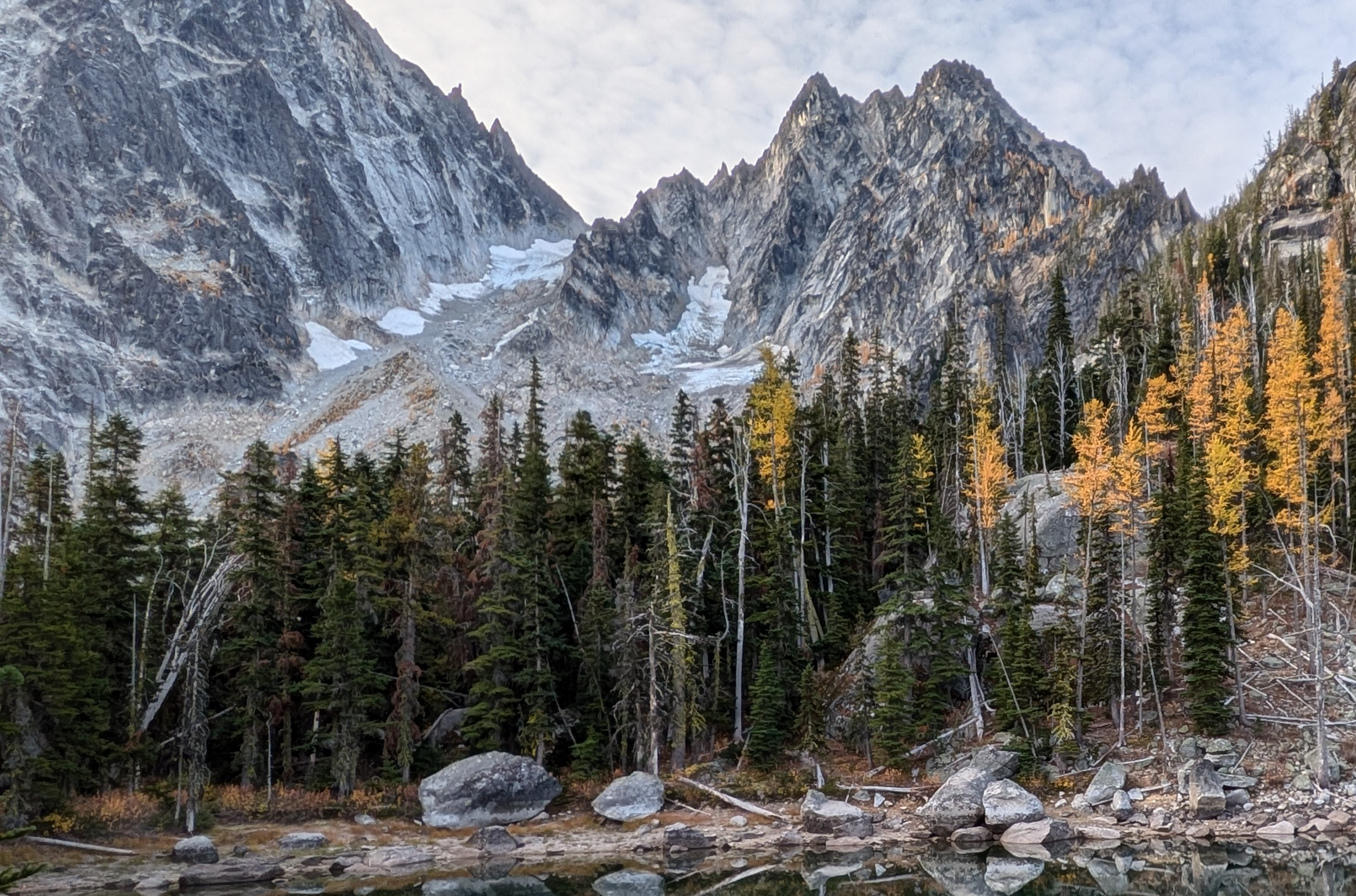
- Remnants of the glacier to the left of Colchuck Peak (upper center) in October 2024

- Location within Washington (state)
- Type: Alpine glacier
- Location: Wenatchee National Forest, Chelan County, Washington, U.S.
- Coordinates: 47°28′48″N 120°50′24″W
- Length: .30 mi (0.48 km)
- Terminus: Barren rock
- Status: Retreating

Colchuck Glacier is in the Stuart Range immediately north of Colchuck Peak and Dragontail Peak, in the U.S. state of Washington. Colchuck Glacier is within the Alpine Lakes Wilderness of Wenatchee National Forest. The glacier is approximately 0.30 mi (0.48 km) in length, 0.10 mi (0.16 km) in width at its widest and descends from 7,600 to 6,400 ft (2,300 to 2,000 m), where it terminates on barren rock and talus. Below the glacier lies Colchuck Lake. The mountain and glacier take their name from the lake, which in Chinook Jargon means "cold water" or "ice".

== See also ==
- List of glaciers in the United States
