= Coney Lake (Chelan County, Washington) =

Lake in Chelan County, Washington, US

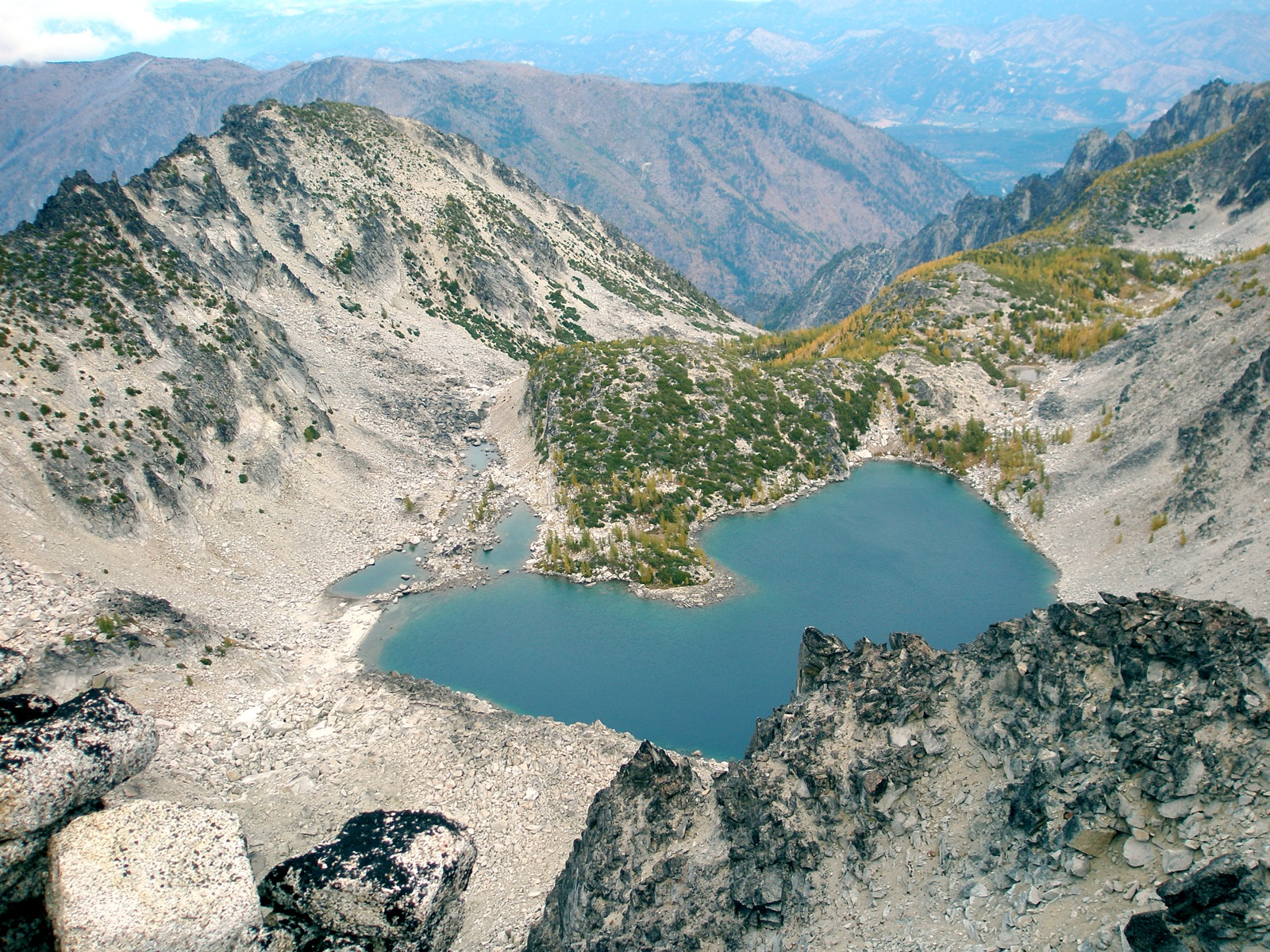
- Coney Lake from Cannon Mountain's Druids Plateau

- Location within Washington (state) Location within the United States
- Location: Chelan County, Washington, United States
- Coordinates: 47.50786°N 120.79443°W
- Primary outflows: Coney Creek
- Basin countries: United States
- Surface elevation: 7,405 ft (2,257 m)

Coney Lake is a small alpine lake located in the Enchantments region of the Alpine Lakes Wilderness in Chelan County, Washington. Coney Lake sits in a bowl formed by a rocky cliff bifurcation of the north skirt of Cannon Mountain that connects to Elf Ridge Peak. Coney Lake has an outflow that is a tributary of Rat Creek, a short distance north-east along Dragon Teeth Peaks. Shield Lake is situated over the opposite side over Elf Ridge.

== See also ==
- List of lakes of the Alpine Lakes Wilderness
