= Colchuck Peak =

Mountain in Washington (state), United States

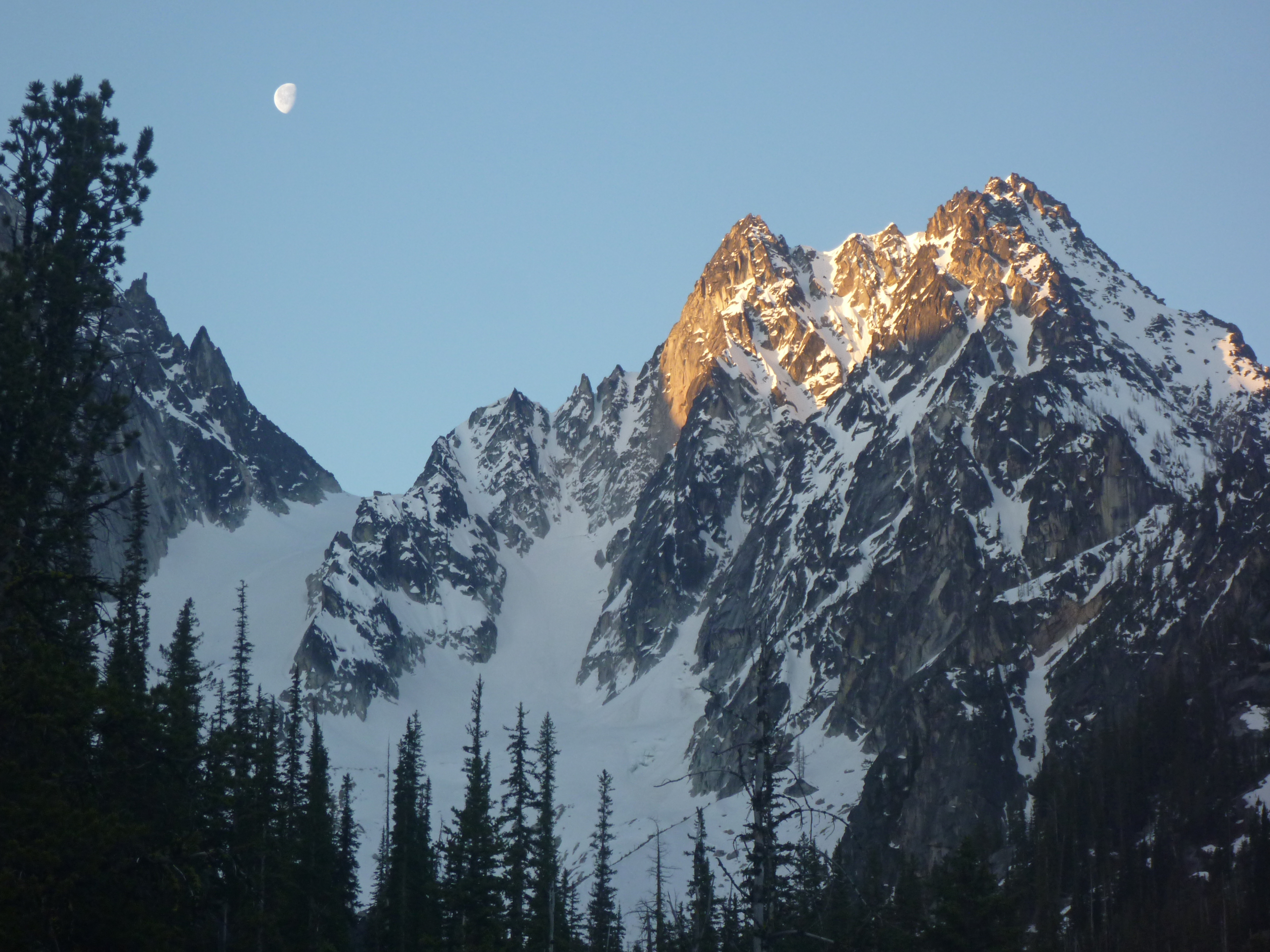
- Colchuck Peak from near Colchuck Lake

Highest point
- Elevation: 8,705+ ft (2,650+ m)
- Prominence: 665 ft (200 m)
- Parent peak: Dragontail Peak (8,860 ft)
- Isolation: 0.63 mi (1.01 km)
- Coordinates: 47°28′42″N 120°50′47″W

Geography
- Location within Washington (state) Location within the United States
- Country: United States of America
- State: Washington
- County: Chelan County
- Protected area: Alpine Lakes Wilderness
- Parent range: Cascades
- Topo map: USGS Enchantment Lakes

Geology
- Rock age: Cretaceous
- Rock type: Granite

Climbing
- First ascent: 1948 Elvin and Norma Johnson, William and Kathy Long
- Easiest route: class 3 scrambling

Colchuck Peak is an 8,705-foot (2,653-metre) mountain summit located in the Stuart Range, in the Alpine Lakes Wilderness in Chelan County of Washington state. The nearest higher peak is Dragontail Peak, 0.49 mi (0.79 km) to the east, and Argonaut Peak lies 0.9 mi (1.4 km) to the southwest. The Colchuck Glacier which lies on the northeast slopes of the peak melts into Colchuck Lake. The mountain and glacier take their name from the lake, which in Chinook Jarrgon means "cold water" or "ice". Precipitation runoff from the peak drains north into Mountaineer Creek, a tributary of Icicle Creek, or south into Ingalls Creek, all of which winds up in the Wenatchee River. Colchuck Peak is more notable for its steep rise above local terrain than for its absolute elevation as topographic relief is significant with the summit rising 3,130 feet (954 m) above Colchuck Lake in 1 mi (1.6 km), and 4,600 feet (1,402 m) above Ingalls Creek in 1.9 mi (3.1 km).

== Climate ==
Most weather fronts originate in the Pacific Ocean, and travel east toward the Cascade Mountains. As fronts approach, they are forced upward by the peaks of the Cascade Range, causing them to drop their moisture in the form of rain or snowfall onto the Cascades (Orographic lift). As a result, the Cascades experience high precipitation, especially during the winter months in the form of snowfall. During winter months, weather is usually cloudy, but, due to high pressure systems over the Pacific Ocean that intensify during summer months, there is often little or no cloud cover during the summer.

== Geology ==
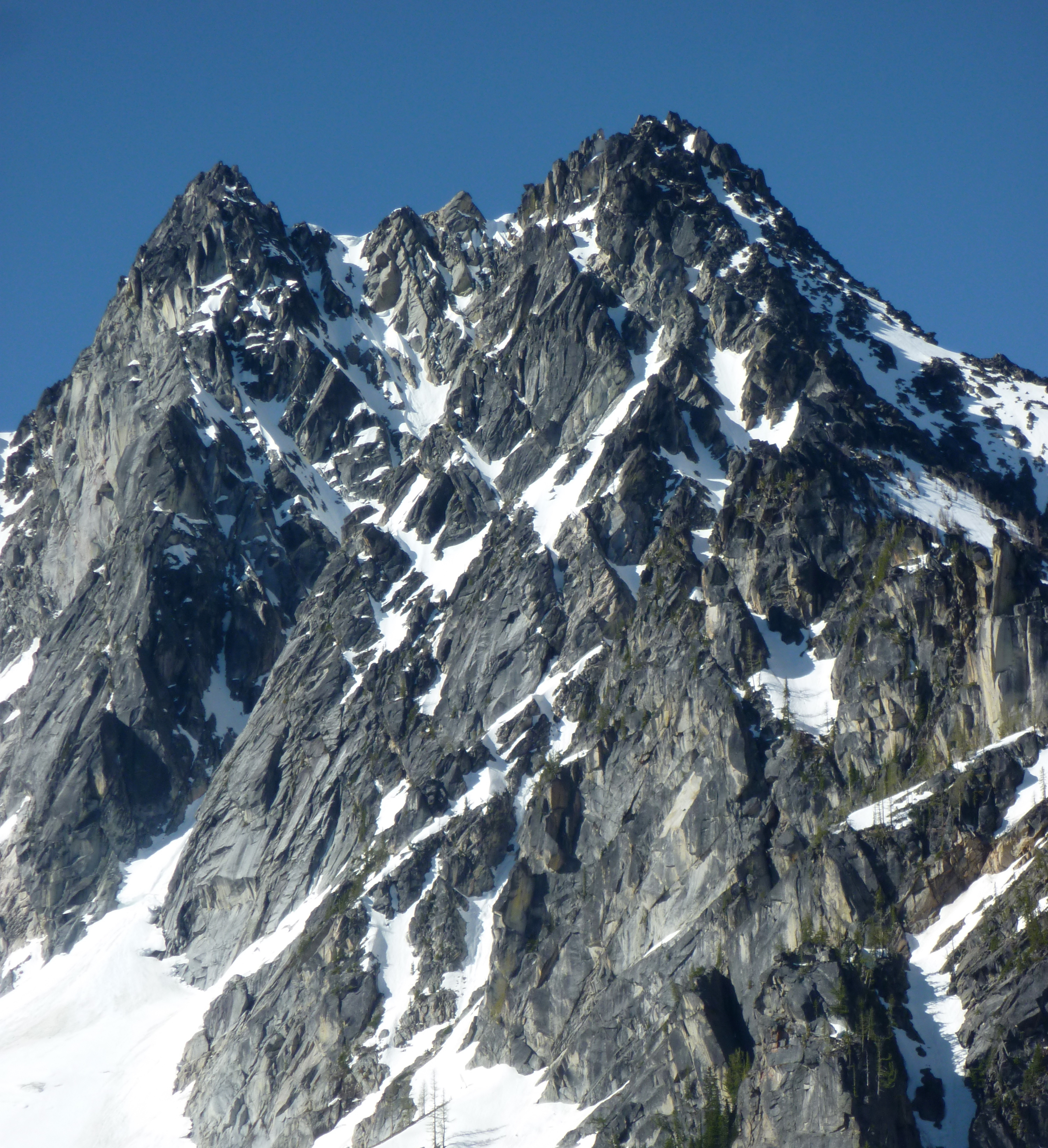
Colchuck Peak detail

The Alpine Lakes Wilderness features some of the most rugged topography in the Cascade Range with craggy peaks and ridges, deep glacial valleys, and granite walls spotted with over 700 mountain lakes. Geological events occurring many years ago created the diverse topography and drastic elevation changes over the Cascade Range leading to the various climate differences.

The history of the formation of the Cascade Mountains dates back millions of years ago to the late Eocene Epoch. With the North American Plate overriding the Pacific Plate, episodes of volcanic igneous activity persisted. In addition, small fragments of the oceanic and continental lithosphere called terranes created the North Cascades about 50 million years ago. Colchuck Peak is situated in part of the Mount Stuart batholith, a large area of clean granite rock that forms the Stuart Range.

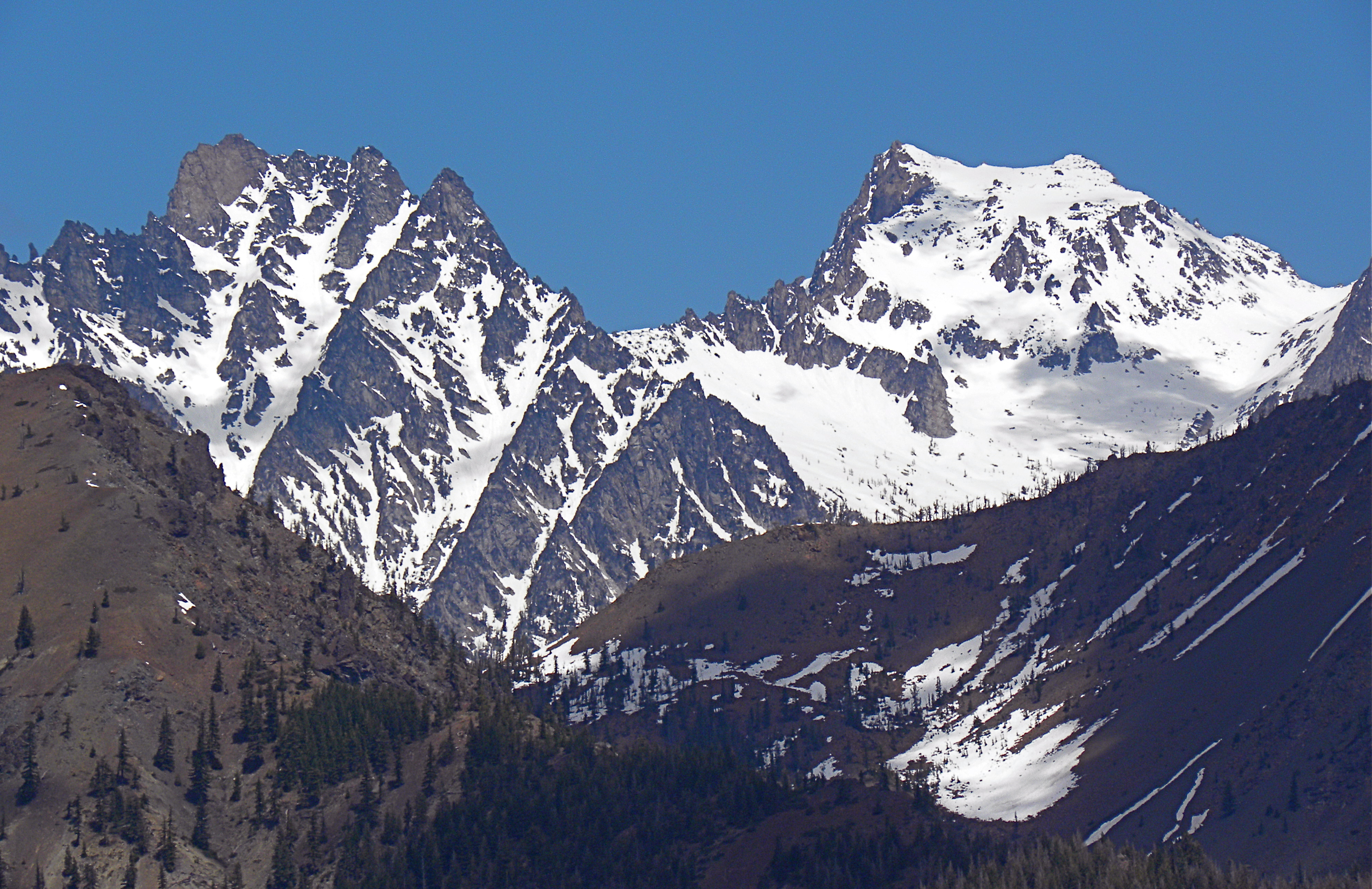
Argonaut Peak (left) and Colchuck Peak (right)

During the Pleistocene period dating back over two million years ago, glaciation advancing and retreating repeatedly scoured the landscape leaving deposits of rock debris. The last glacial retreat in the Alpine Lakes area began about 14,000 years ago and was north of the Canada–US border by 10,000 years ago. The U-shaped cross section of the river valleys is a result of that recent glaciation. Uplift and faulting in combination with glaciation have been the dominant processes which have created the tall peaks and deep valleys of the Alpine Lakes Wilderness area.

== Accidents ==
Three members of a climbing group from the northeast US were killed on February 20, 2023, when the lead climber triggered a slab avalanche. A fourth member was injured.
