= Sherpa Peak =

Mountain in Washington (state), United States

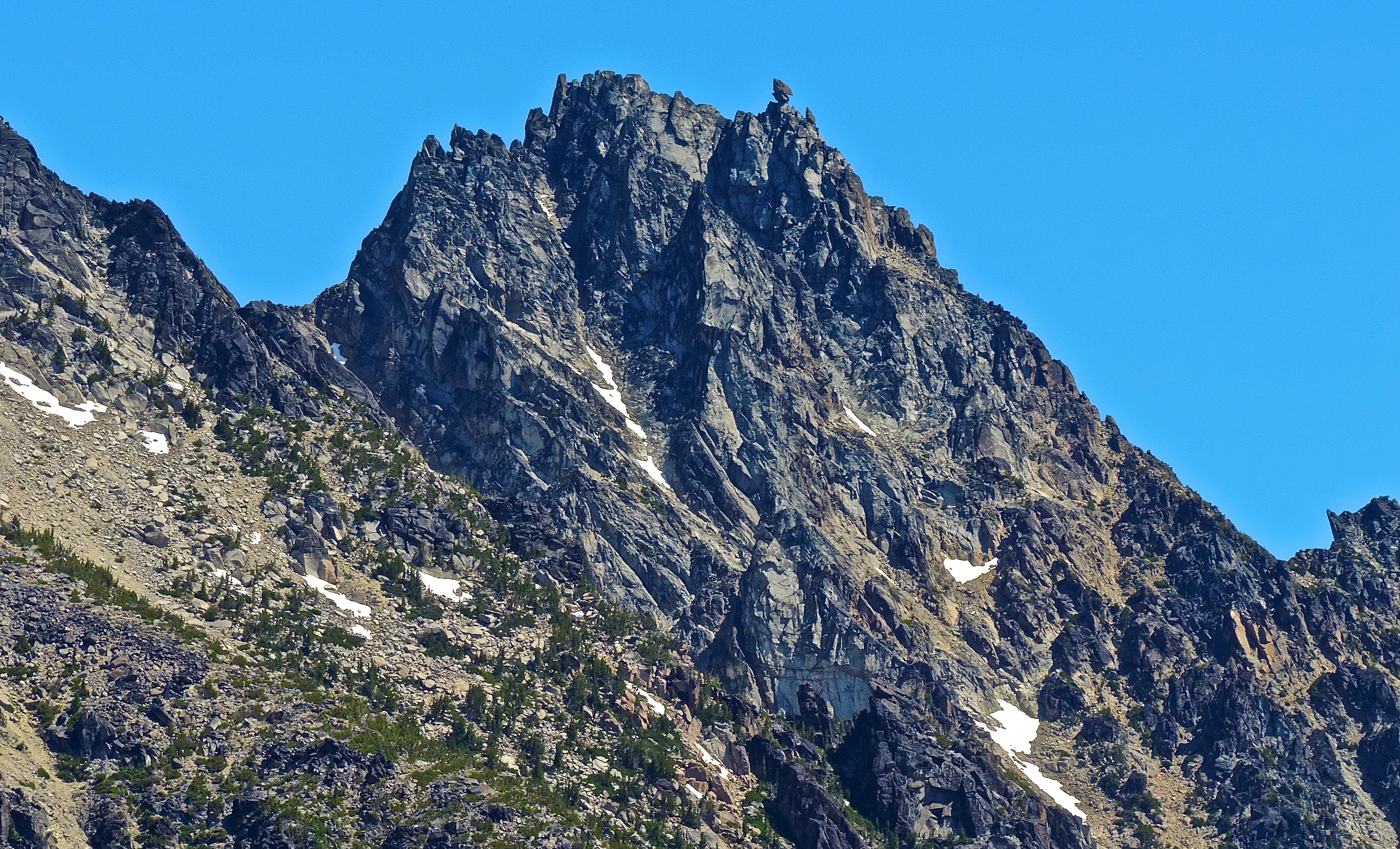
- Sherpa Peak from Longs Pass

Highest point
- Elevation: 8,630 ft (2,630 m)
- Prominence: 432 ft (132 m)
- Parent peak: Mount Stuart
- Coordinates: 47°28′19″N 120°53′20″W

Geography
- Location within Washington (state) Location within the United States
- Country: United States
- State: Washington
- County: Chelan
- Protected area: Alpine Lakes Wilderness
- Parent range: Stuart Range; Cascade Range
- Topo map: USGS Mount Stuart

Geology
- Rock age: Cretaceous
- Rock type: Granite

Climbing
- First ascent: 1955 Dave Mahre, Bill Prater, and Gene Prater
- Easiest route: class 4 scrambling

Sherpa Peak is an 8,630-foot (2,630-metre) granite summit located in the Stuart Range, in the Alpine Lakes Wilderness in Chelan County of Washington state. The nearest higher peak is Mount Stuart, 0.41 mi (0.66 km) to the west, and Argonaut Peak lies 1.29 mi (2.08 km) to the east. The Sherpa Glacier lies on the northern slope of the peak. Precipitation runoff from the peak drains north into Mountaineer Creek, a tributary of Icicle Creek, or south into Ingalls Creek, all of which winds up in the Wenatchee River. According to the USGS, this peak is named for a local climbing club that was active in the area in the 1950s, and the toponym was officially adopted in 1988 by the U.S. Board on Geographic Names.

== Climate ==
Weather fronts originating in the Pacific Ocean typically travel east toward the Cascade Mountains. As fronts approach, they are forced upward by the peaks (orographic lift), causing them to drop their moisture in the form of rain or snow onto the Cascades. As a result, the Cascades experience high precipitation, especially during the winter months in the form of snowfall. During winter months, weather is usually cloudy, but due to high pressure systems over the Pacific Ocean that intensify during summer months, there is often little or no cloud cover during the summer.

== Geology ==
The Alpine Lakes Wilderness features some of the most rugged topography in the Cascade Range with craggy peaks and ridges, deep glacial valleys, and granite walls spotted with over 700 mountain lakes. Geological events occurring many years ago created the diverse topography and drastic elevation changes over the Cascade Range leading to the various climate differences.

The history of the formation of the Cascade Mountains dates back millions of years ago to the late Eocene Epoch. With the North American Plate overriding the Pacific Plate, episodes of volcanic igneous activity persisted. In addition, small fragments of the oceanic and continental lithosphere called terranes created the North Cascades about 50 million years ago. Sherpa Peak is situated in part of the Mount Stuart batholith, a large area of clean granite rock that forms the Stuart Range.

During the Pleistocene period dating back over two million years ago, glaciation advancing and retreating repeatedly scoured the landscape leaving deposits of rock debris. The last glacial retreat in the Alpine Lakes area began about 14,000 years ago and was north of the Canada–US border by 10,000 years ago. The U-shaped cross section of the river valleys is a result of that recent glaciation. Uplift and faulting in combination with glaciation have been the dominant processes which have created the tall peaks and deep valleys of the Alpine Lakes Wilderness area.

== Gallery ==
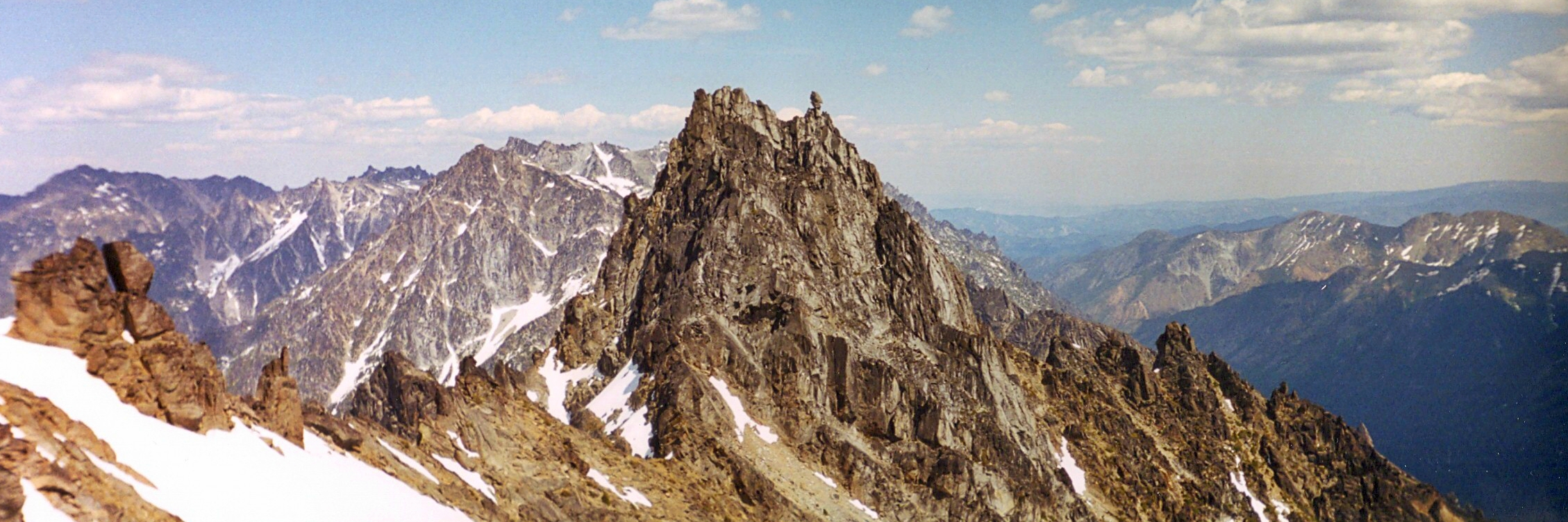
Sherpa Peak from slope of Mount Stuart

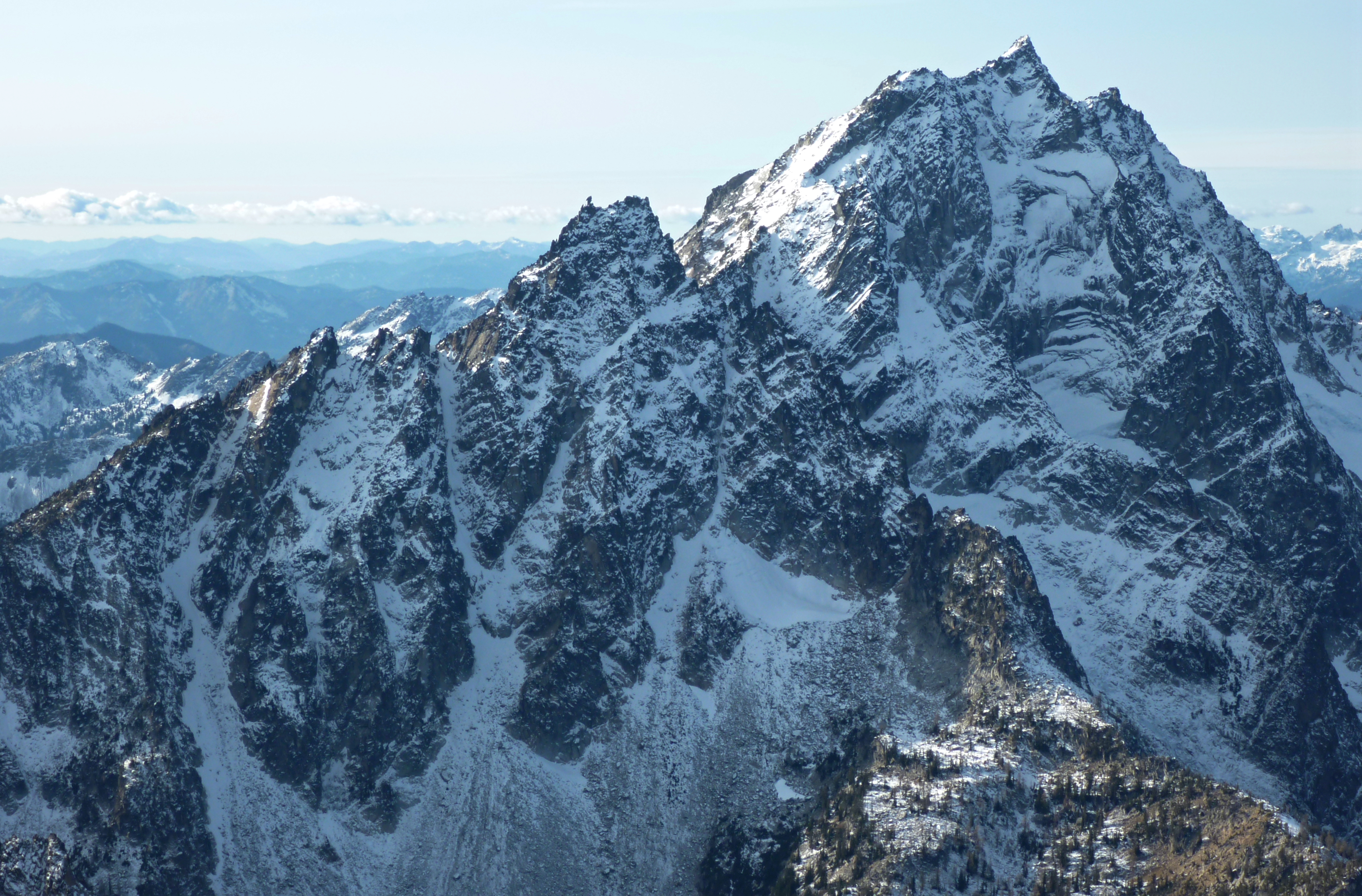
Sherpa Peak centered with Mt. Stuart to right

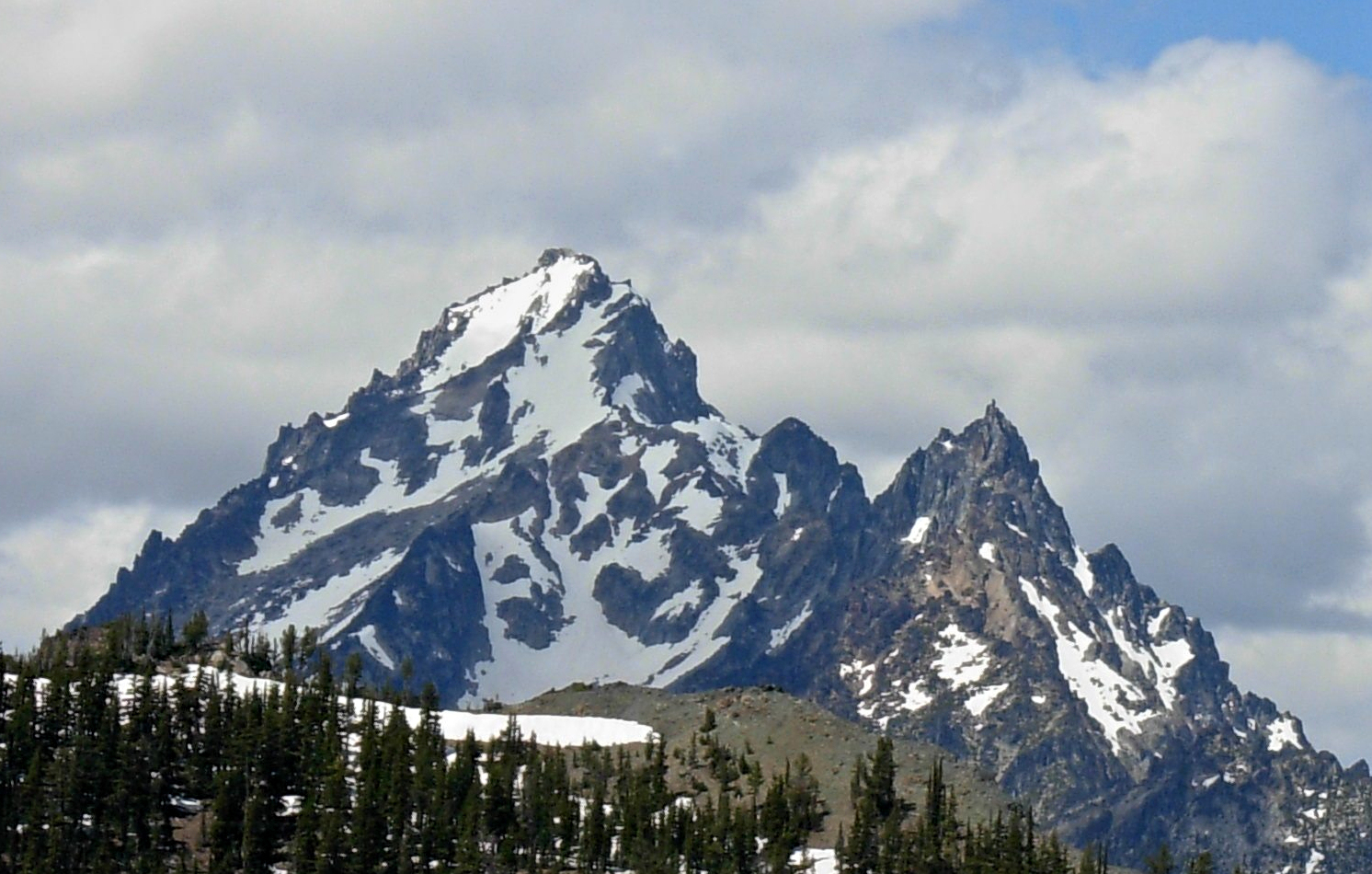
Mount Stuart with Sherpa Peak to right

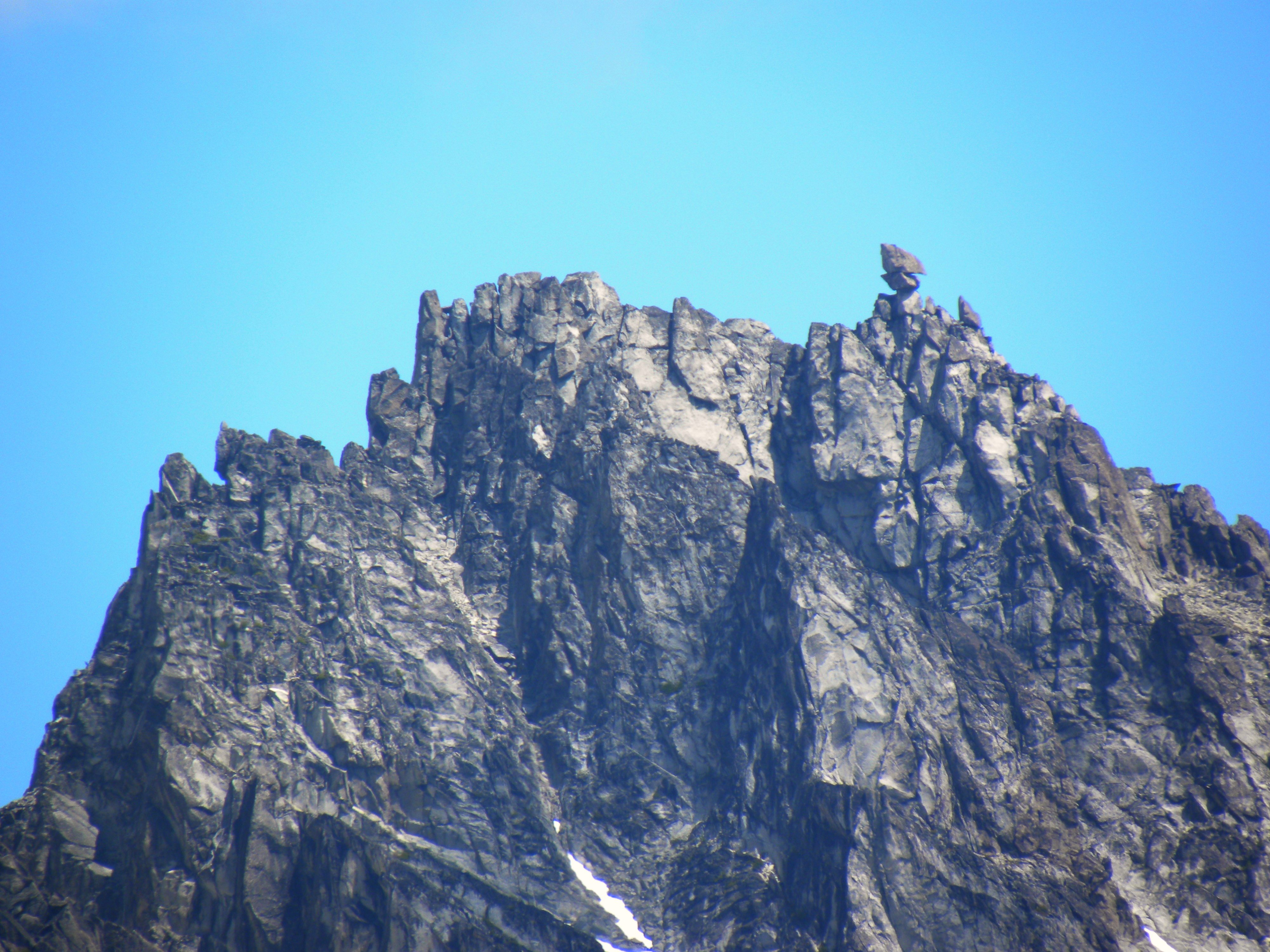
Sherpa Peak's balanced rock

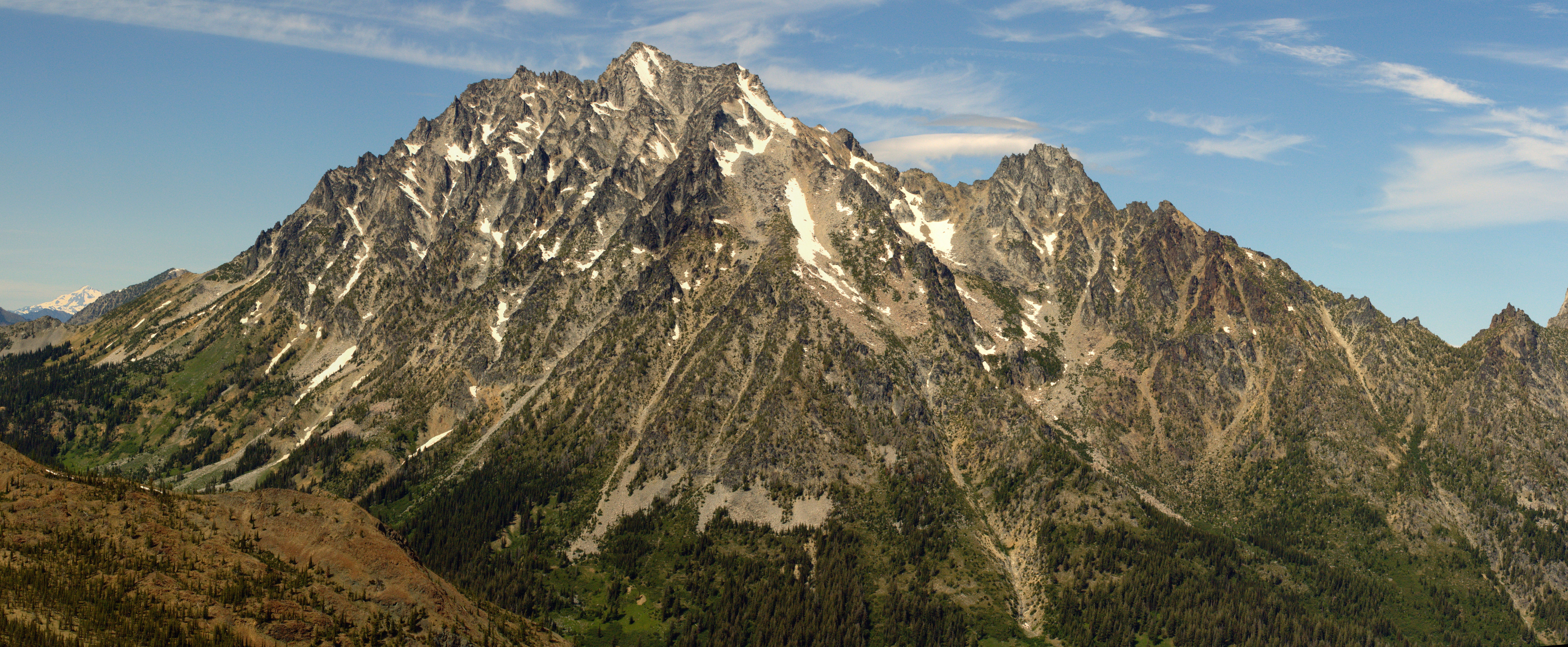
Mt. Stuart with Sherpa Peak to right of center

== See also ==
- List of peaks of the Alpine Lakes Wilderness
