= Cannon Mountain (Washington) =

Mountain in Washington (state), United States

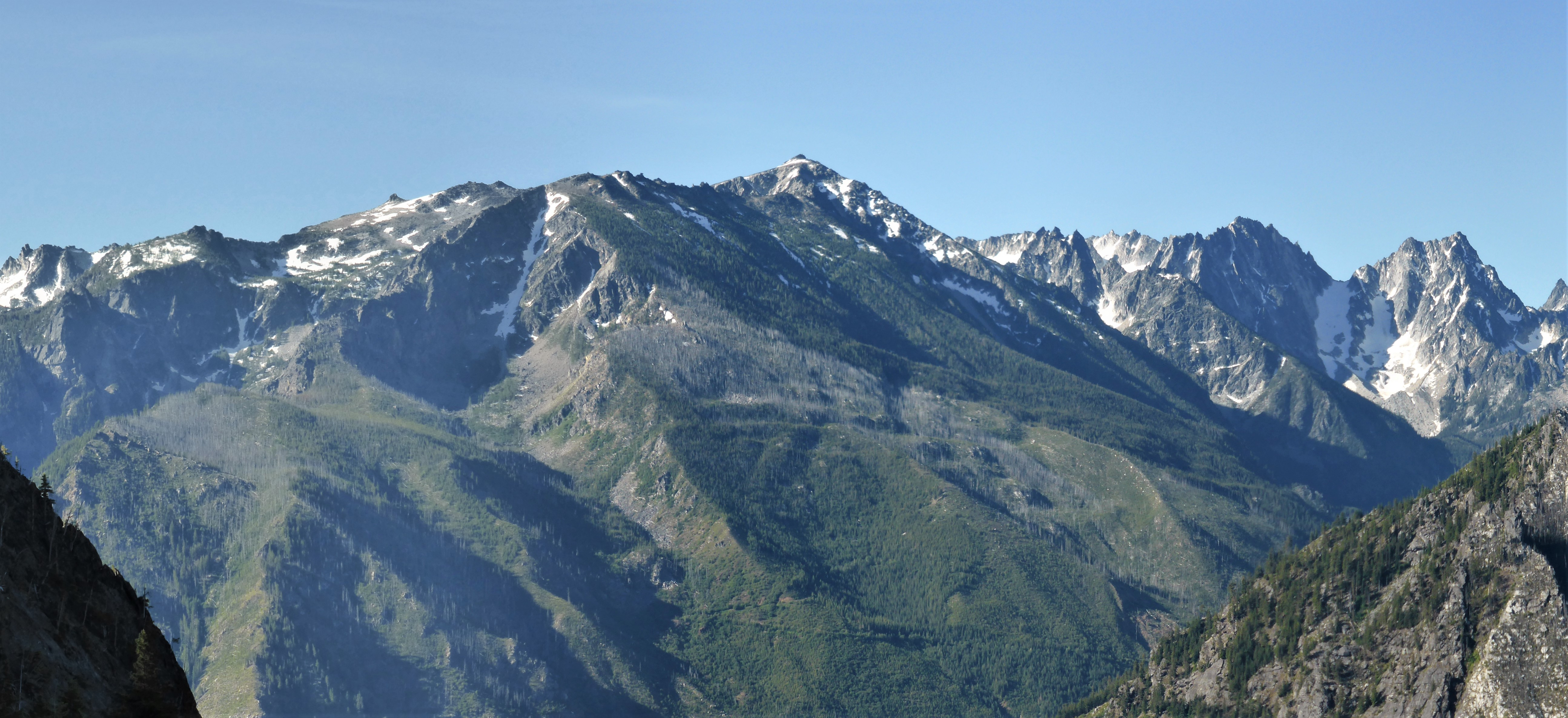
- Cannon Mountain, north aspect

Highest point
- Elevation: 8,652 ft (2,637 m)
- Prominence: 838 ft (255 m)
- Parent peak: Dragontail Peak
- Isolation: 2.15 mi (3.46 km)
- Coordinates: 47°30′10″N 120°48′09″W

Geography
- Location within Washington (state) Location within the United States
- Country: United States
- State: Washington
- County: Chelan
- Protected area: Alpine Lakes Wilderness
- Parent range: Cascade Range; Wenatchee Mountains; Stuart Range
- Topo map: USGS Cashmere Mountain

Geology
- Rock type: Granite

Climbing
- First ascent: 1921
- Easiest route: Hiking YDS 2

Cannon Mountain is an 8,652-foot (2,637 meter) mountain summit located in Chelan County of Washington state. Cannon Mountain is part of The Enchantments, within the Alpine Lakes Wilderness. Cannon Mountain belongs to the Stuart Range which is subset of the Cascade Range. Cannon Mountain is situated one mile north of Enchantment Peak. The nearest higher peak is Dragontail Peak, 2.15 mi (3.46 km) to the southwest. Precipitation runoff from the slopes drains into Icicle Creek, which is a tributary of the Wenatchee River.

== Geology ==
The Alpine Lakes Wilderness features some of the most rugged topography in the Cascade Range with craggy peaks and ridges, deep glacial valleys, and granite walls spotted with over 700 mountain lakes. Geological events occurring many years ago created the diverse topography and drastic elevation changes over the Cascade Range leading to the various climate differences.

The history of the formation of the Cascade Mountains dates back millions of years ago to the late Eocene Epoch. With the North American Plate overriding the Pacific Plate, episodes of volcanic igneous activity persisted. In addition, small fragments of the oceanic and continental lithosphere called terranes created the North Cascades about 50 million years ago.

During the Pleistocene period dating back over two million years ago, glaciation advancing and retreating repeatedly scoured the landscape leaving deposits of rock debris. The last glacial retreat in the Alpine Lakes area began about 14,000 years ago and was north of the Canada–US border by 10,000 years ago. The U-shaped cross section of the river valleys is a result of that recent glaciation. Uplift and faulting in combination with glaciation have been the dominant processes which have created the tall peaks and deep valleys of the Alpine Lakes Wilderness area.

== Climate ==
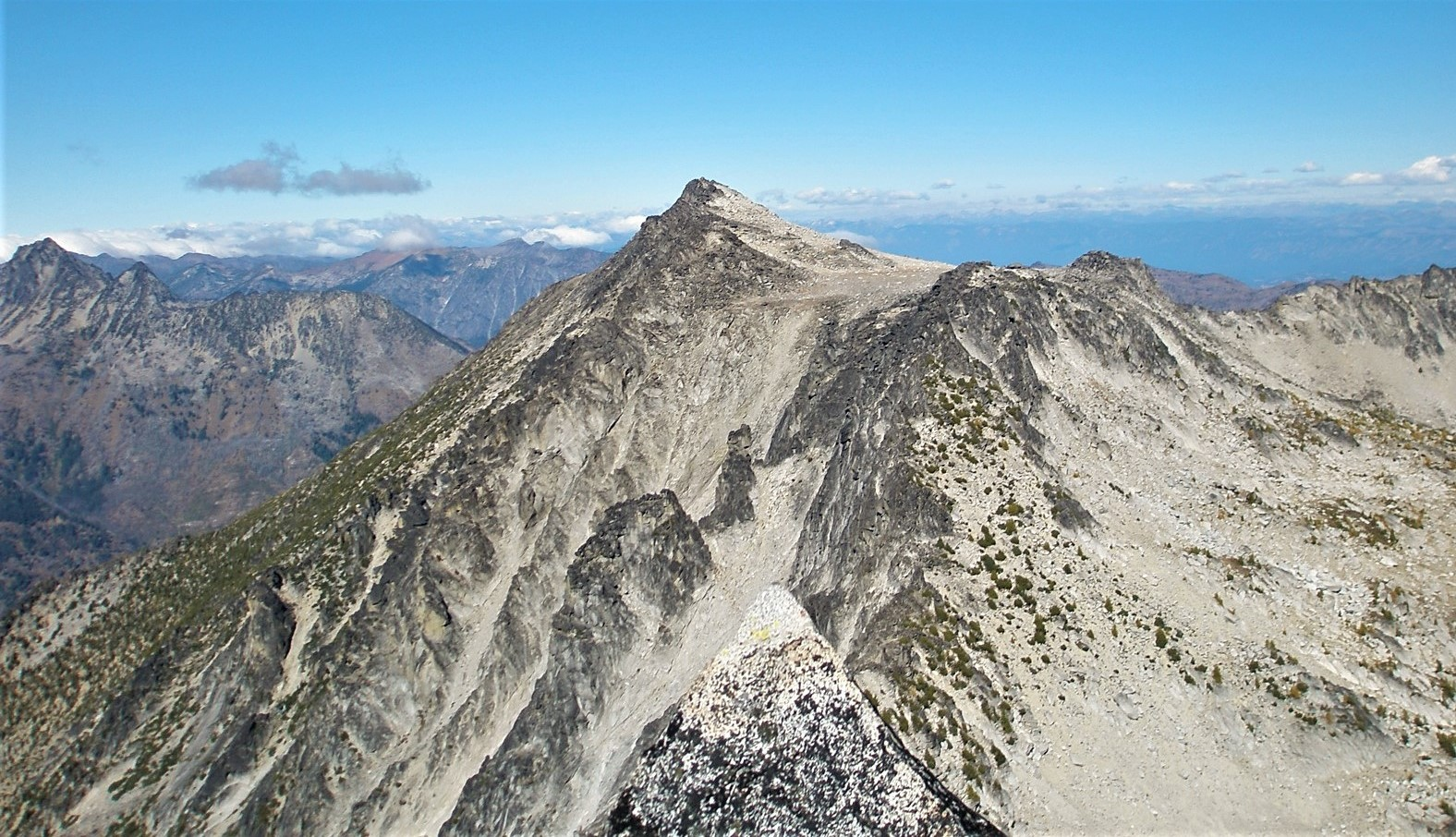
South aspect of Cannon Mountain seen from Enchantment Peak

Most weather fronts that originate in the north Pacific Ocean travel east toward the Cascade Mountains. As fronts approach, they are forced upward by the peaks (orographic lift), causing them to drop their moisture in the form of rain or snow onto the Cascades. As a result, the Cascades experience high precipitation, especially during the winter months in the form of snowfall. During winter months, weather is usually cloudy, but due to high pressure systems over the Pacific Ocean that intensify during summer months, there is often little or no cloud cover during the summer.

== See also ==
- List of peaks of the Alpine Lakes Wilderness
