= Stuart Range =

Mountain range in Washington, United States

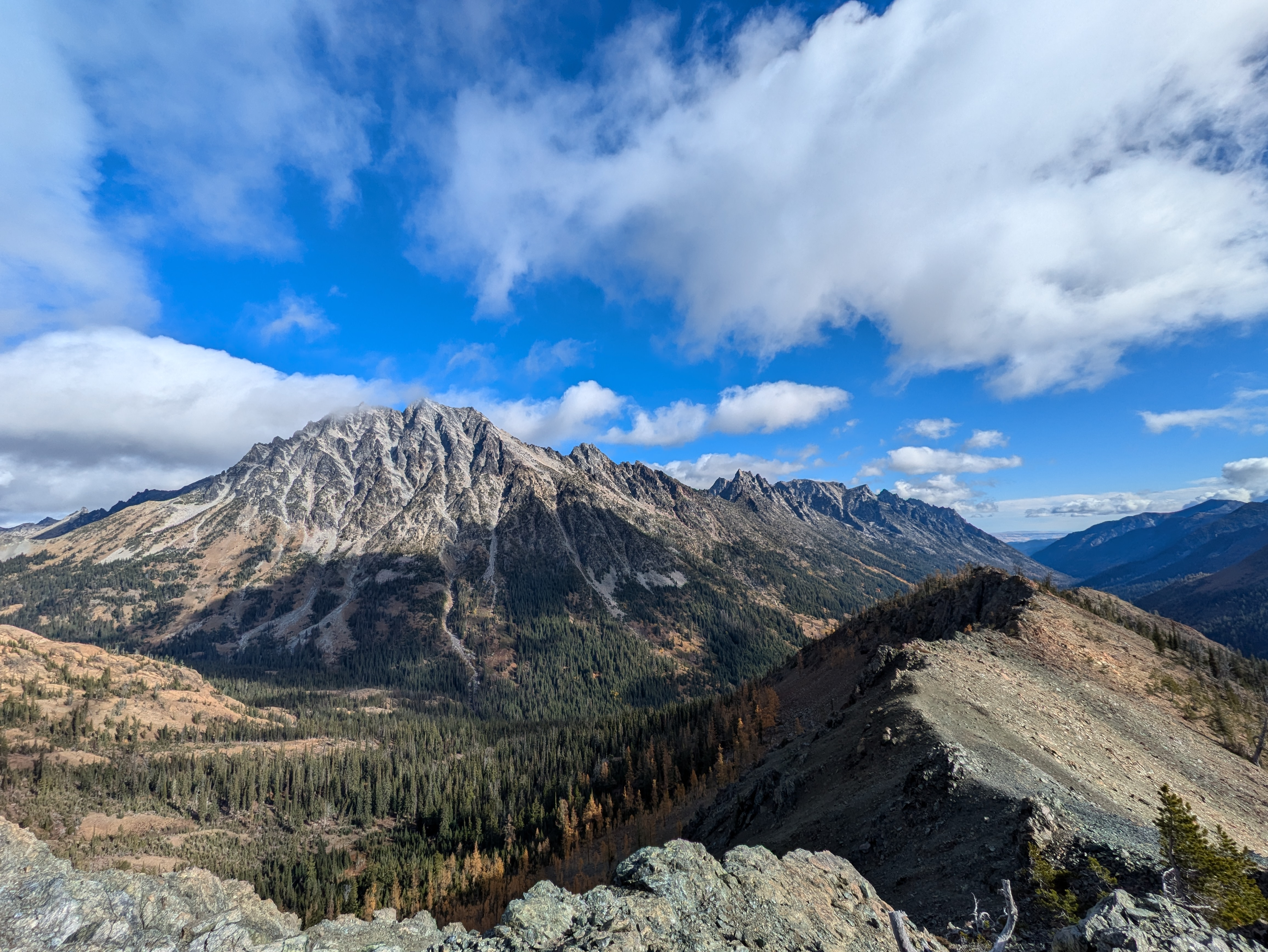
- Stuart Range from the southwest, starting with Mount Stuart on the left

Highest point
- Parent peak: Mount Stuart
- Coordinates: 47°31′00″N 120°46′00″W

Geography
- Location: Washington

Mount Stuart and the Stuart Range

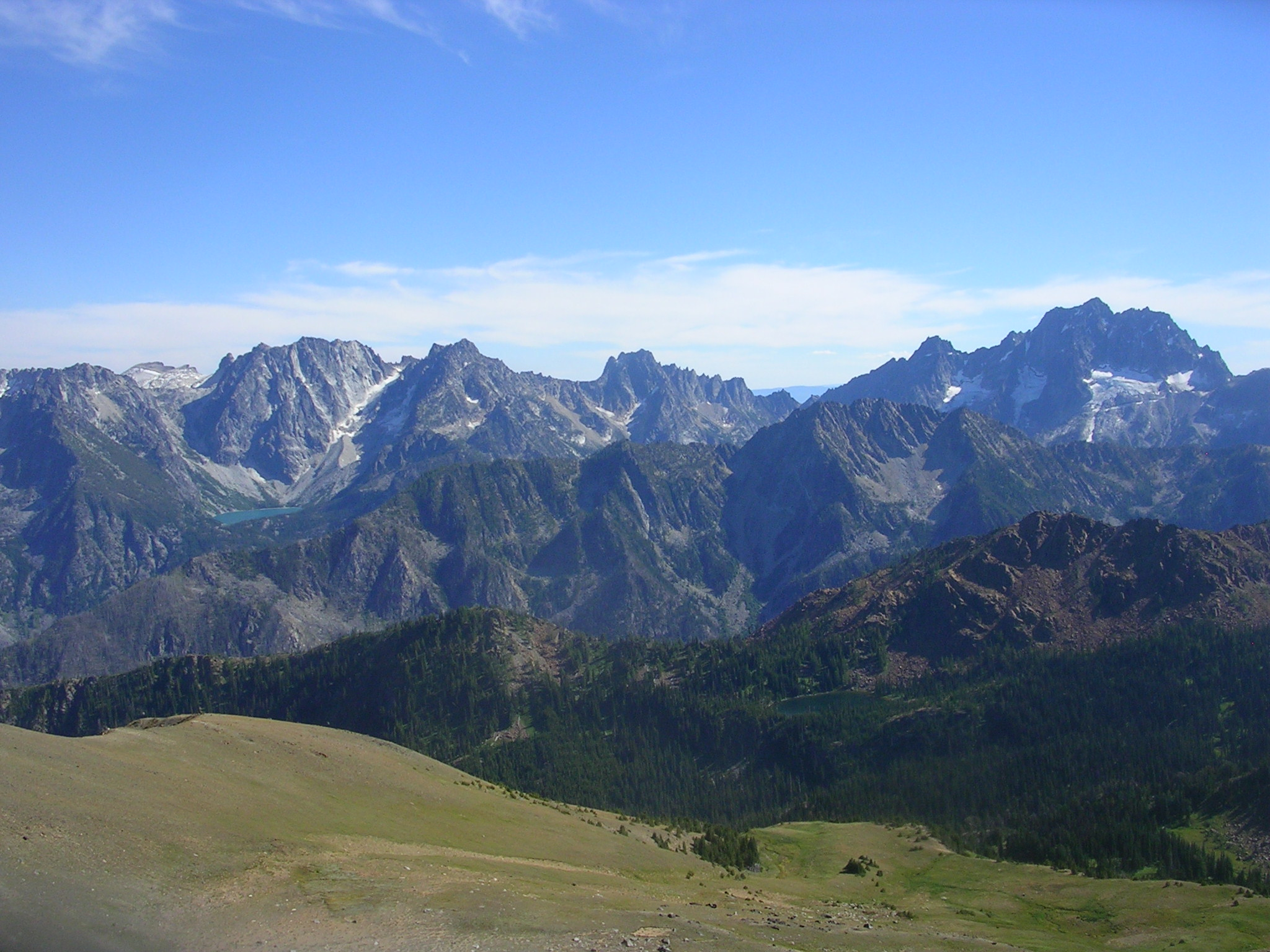
Stuart Range from Cashmere Peak in the Wenatchee Mountains

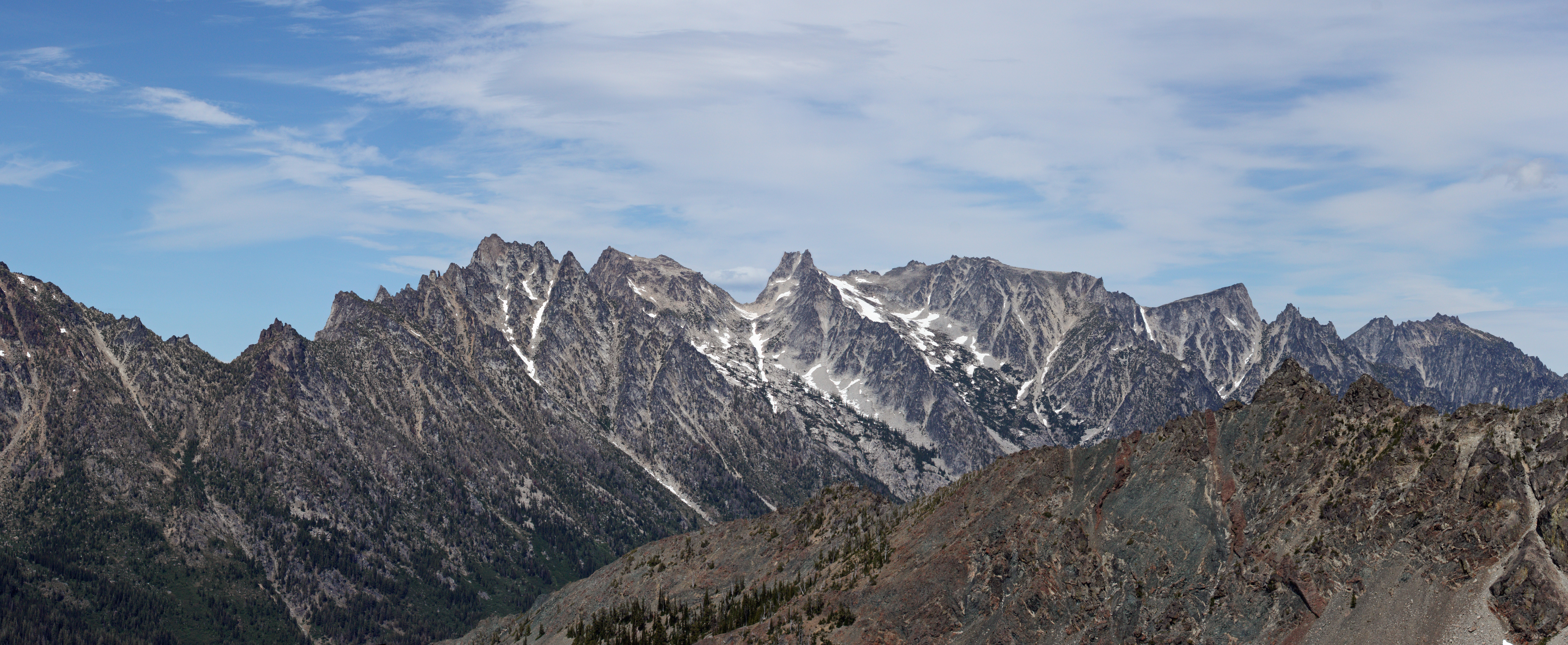
Argonaut Peak, left center; Colchuck Peak, center; Dragontail Peak, right center; from the southwest

The Stuart Range is a mountain range in central Washington, United States. The range lies within the eastern extent of the Cascade Range immediately southwest of Leavenworth and runs east–west. The western peaks make up a single sharp ridge. The eastern half of the range splits into two parallel ridges, the northern of which is known as the Enchantment Peaks. Between these ridges lies the Enchantment Basin, which holds the dozens of tarns known as the Enchantment Lakes. Collectively, the basin and the encircling eastern peaks of the Stuart Range make up The Enchantments, a well-known backpacking destination. The south face of the Stuart Range falls off steeply to Ingalls Creek, beyond which rise the roughly parallel Wenatchee Mountains.

== Partial list of peaks ==
A list of notable peaks is below. Within each subsection, peaks are ordered as nearly as possible from west to east.

=== Western peaks ===
- Mount Stuart - 9,209 feet (2,807 m) -
- Sherpa Peak - 8,478 feet (2,584 m) -
- Argonaut Peak - 8,369 feet (2,551 m) -
- Colchuck Peak - 8,507 feet (2,593 m) -
- Dragontail Peak - 8,809 feet (2,685 m) -

=== Eastern peaks of south ridge ===
- Witches Tower - 8,520 feet (2,600 m) -
- Little Annapurna - 8,458 feet (2,578 m) -
- McClellan Peak - 8,225 feet (2,507 m) -
- Rocket Peak - 7,375 feet (2,248 m) -
- Gremlin Peak - 7,250 feet (2,210 m) -

=== Enchantment Peaks (eastern peaks of north ridge) ===
- Colchuck Balanced Rock - 8,200 feet (2,500 m)+ -
- Cannon Mountain - 8,579 feet (2,615 m) -
- Enchantment Peak - 8,520 feet (2,600 m)+ -
- Prusik Peak - 7,858 feet (2,395 m) -
- The Temple - 8,035 feet (2,449 m) -
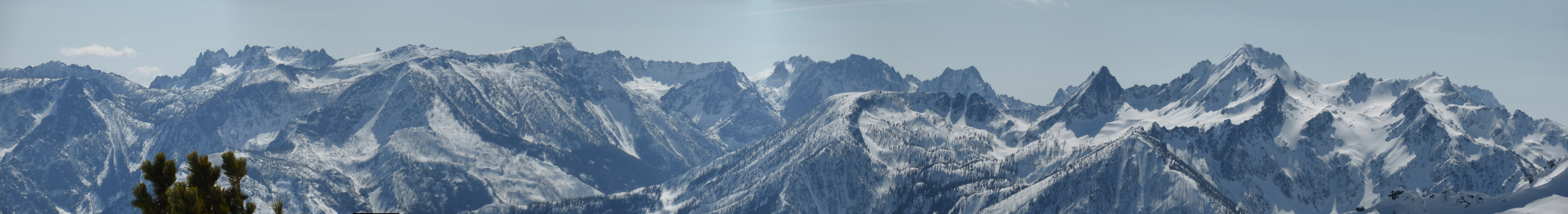
Enchantment Peaks

== Geology ==
The Mount Stuart batholith underlies the Stuart Range and the nearby Wenatchee Mountains. The batholith is about 13 by 16 miles in extent. Two plutonic masses are separated by a thin screen of Chiwaukum Schist and rocks of the Ingalls Complex. The more-eastern pluton is 93 million years old, while the more-western rock mass is between 83 and 86 million years old. Exposed rock tends to be quartz diorite and granodiorite.

The range sits near a convergent plate boundary where one plate overrides another. In Western Washington, the North American Plate overrides the Juan de Fuca Plate, resulting in both volcanic and seismic activity. This convergence has been ongoing for over 200 million years. Continuing uplift and erosion has exposed the underlying granite batholith, making for one of the more spectacular mountain ranges in Washington.

== See also ==
- List of mountain ranges in Washington
- Peakbagger info: Stuart Range
