= Dragontail Peak =

Mountain in Washington (state), United States

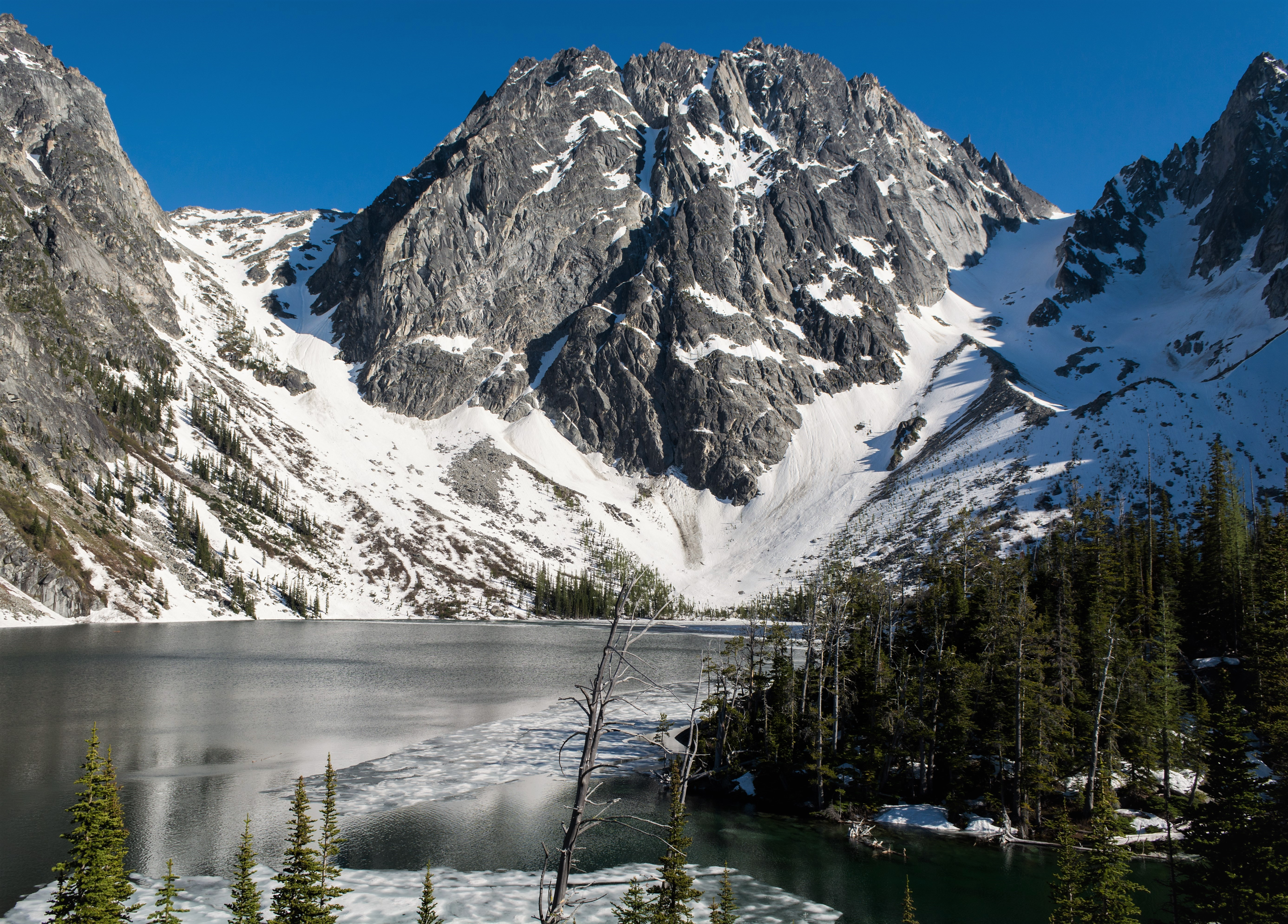
- Dragontail Peak seen from Colchuck Lake

Highest point
- Elevation: 8,840+ ft (2,690+ m) NGVD 29
- Prominence: 1,760 ft (540 m)
- Coordinates: 47°28′43″N 120°50′00″W

Geography
- Location: Chelan County, Washington, U.S.
- Parent range: Cascades
- Topo map: USGS Enchantment Lakes

Geology
- Rock age: Cretaceous
- Mountain type: Granite

Climbing
- Easiest route: Scramble

Dragontail Peak, also known as Dragon Tail, is a mountain in the Stuart Range, in Chelan County, Washington. While climbing an adjacent peak, Lex Maxwell, Bob McCall, and Bill Prater remarked that the needles on the crest, southwest of the summit, resembled a "dragon tail". The name was officially accepted in 1955. On the mountain's northeast flank lies Colchuck Lake which drains into Mountaineer Creek, and Colchuck Glacier lies below the western slopes of the peak. On its south side the mountain drops steeply (50% slope) to Ingalls Creek, which flows about 5,800 feet (1,800 m) below the summit.

The mountain, which lies in the Alpine Lakes Wilderness, bordered by Colchuck Peak, Little Annapurna, and Cannon Mountain, is composed of a granite formation that creates the Stuart Range. Dragontail is the second highest mountain in the range, second only to Mount Stuart which lies 3.2 miles (5.1 km) to the west and reaches 9,415 feet (2,870 m).

The two needles, on ridge southwest of the summit which gave rise to its name, serve as formidable alpine climbing objectives that demand more than 20 pitches of sustained climbing. The area around Dragontail Peak is dominated by wilderness and is protected from development.

The Enchantments, to northeast of Dragontail, is an area of towering peaks, year-round snow, and alpine lakes. It forms the heart of the Alpine Lakes Wilderness.

== Climate ==
Most weather fronts originate in the Pacific Ocean, and travel east toward the Cascade Mountains. As fronts approach, they are forced upward by the peaks of the Cascade Range, causing them to drop their moisture in the form of rain or snowfall onto the Cascades (Orographic lift). As a result, the Cascades experience high precipitation, especially during the winter months in the form of snowfall. During winter months, weather is usually cloudy, but, due to high pressure systems over the Pacific Ocean that intensify during summer months, there is often little or no cloud cover during the summer. Because of maritime influence, snow tends to be wet and heavy, resulting in high avalanche danger.

== Geology ==
The Alpine Lakes Wilderness features some of the most rugged topography in the Cascade Range with craggy peaks and ridges, deep glacial valleys, and granite walls spotted with over 700 mountain lakes. Geological events occurring many years ago created the diverse topography and drastic elevation changes over the Cascade Range leading to the various climate differences.

The history of the formation of the Cascade Mountains dates back millions of years ago to the late Eocene Epoch. With the North American Plate overriding the Pacific Plate, episodes of volcanic igneous activity persisted. In addition, small fragments of the oceanic and continental lithosphere called terranes created the North Cascades about 50 million years ago.

During the Pleistocene period dating back over two million years ago, glaciation advancing and retreating repeatedly scoured the landscape leaving deposits of rock debris. The last glacial retreat in the Alpine Lakes area began about 14,000 years ago and was north of the Canada–US border by 10,000 years ago. The U-shaped cross section of the river valleys is a result of that recent glaciation. Uplift and faulting in combination with glaciation have been the dominant processes which have created the tall peaks and deep valleys of the Alpine Lakes Wilderness area.

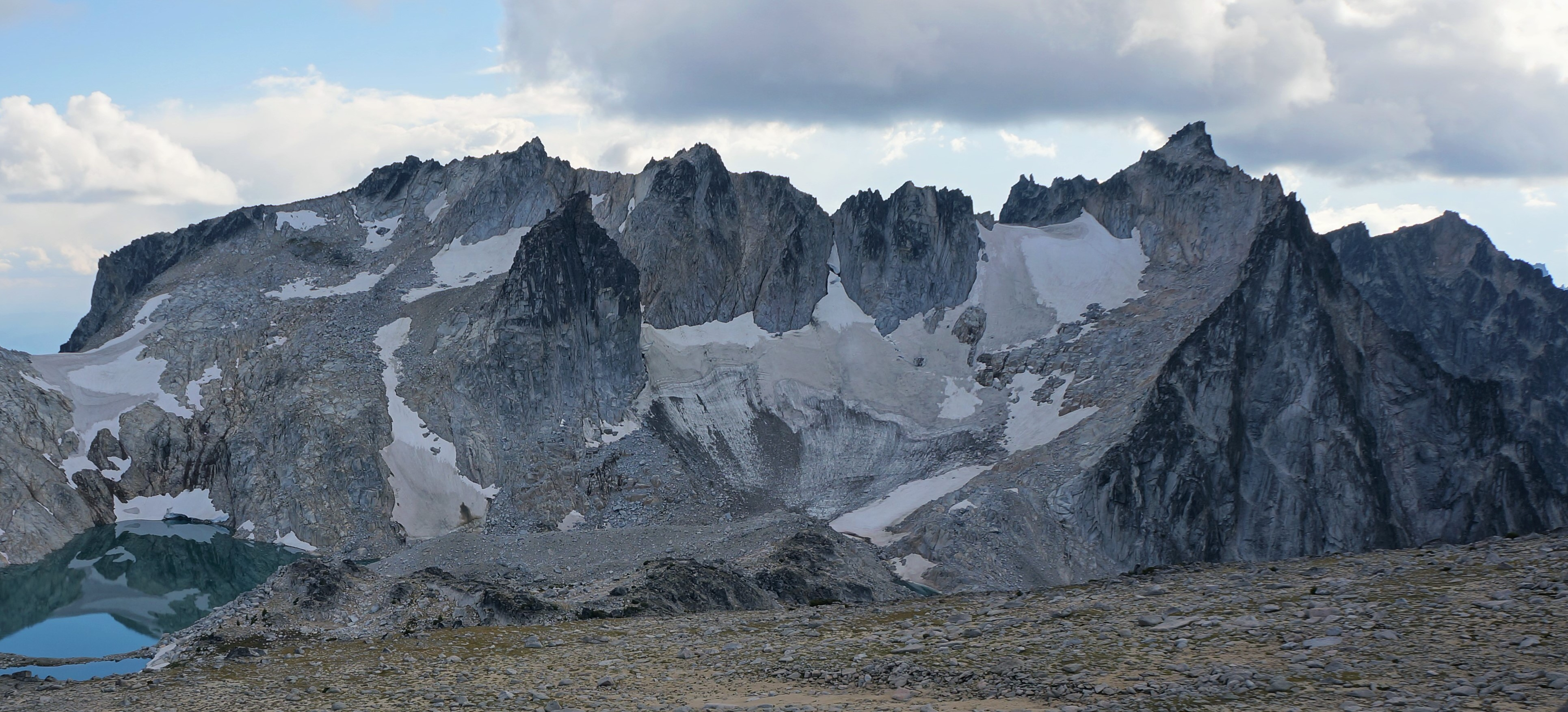
Dragontail from northeast
