= Gravel Lake =

Lake in Washington State, USA

- Location within Washington (state) Location within the United States
- Location: King County, Washington
- Coordinates: 47.4649833°N 121.3691402°W
- Basin countries: United States
- Surface area: 8 acres (0.032 km^{2})
- Surface elevation: 5,125 ft (1,562 m)
- Islands: 0

Gravel Lake is a small freshwater lake located at the edge of the Pacific Crest Trail on the western skirt of Mount Thomson at the border between King County and Kittitas County, Washington. The lake is a popular area for hiking, swimming, and fishing golden trout and rainbow trout. Other Alpine lakes are in the vicinity, including the Alaska Lake a short distance east, and Joe Lake and Edds Lake northbound on the PCT. To the east is Hibox Mountain.

== Location ==
Access to Gravel Lake and surrounding areas is through the Pacific Crest Trail's Kendell Katwalk. Most visitors to Gravel Lake are day hikers although the lake is provided with campsites. Gold Creek Trail connects to the Pacific Crest Trail on the east ridge of Gravel Lake.

== Climate ==
Gravel Lake is located in a hemiboreal climate, part of the marine west coast climate zone of western North America. Temperatures and precipitation is similar to neighbor lakes like Alaska Lake. The wettest month is January, with 396 millimeters of rain, and the least in July, with 38 millimeters of rain.

== See also ==
- List of lakes of the Alpine Lakes Wilderness
