= Edds Lake =

Lake in Washington state, United States

- Location within Washington (state) Location within the United States
- Location: King County, Washington
- Coordinates: 47.4718578°N 121.3481185°W
- Basin countries: United States
- Surface area: 24.1 acres (0.098 km^{2})
- Surface elevation: 4,301 ft (1,311 m)
- Islands: 0

Edds Lake is a freshwater lake located on the western slope of Huckleberry Mountain at the border between King County and Kittitas County, Washington. The lake is a popular area for hiking, swimming, and fishing for golden trout. The Pacific Crest Trail runs just East of the lake, a prominent ridge that separates Edds Lake from Joe Lake and Alaska Lake , south towards Kendall Katwalk. Other Alpine lakes are in the vicinity, including Chikamin Lake, a short distance north, at the base of Chikamin Peak the west is Mount Thomson on Bumblebee Pass.

== Recreation ==
Edds Lake is equipped with camping areas at the outlet shore of the lake. The rest of the shores of the lake are surrounded by steep cliffs and large boulders with heather and other brush and swathes. The Pacific Crest Trail borders over a crest on the East and South of the lake, with the slope of Huckleberry Mountain, a frequently traveled trail that makes a class 4 scramble leading to the summit. Surrounding moraines towards the west lead to Burnt Boot Creek.

== See also ==
- List of lakes of the Alpine Lakes Wilderness
