= Burnt Boot Peak =

Mountain in Washington (state), United States

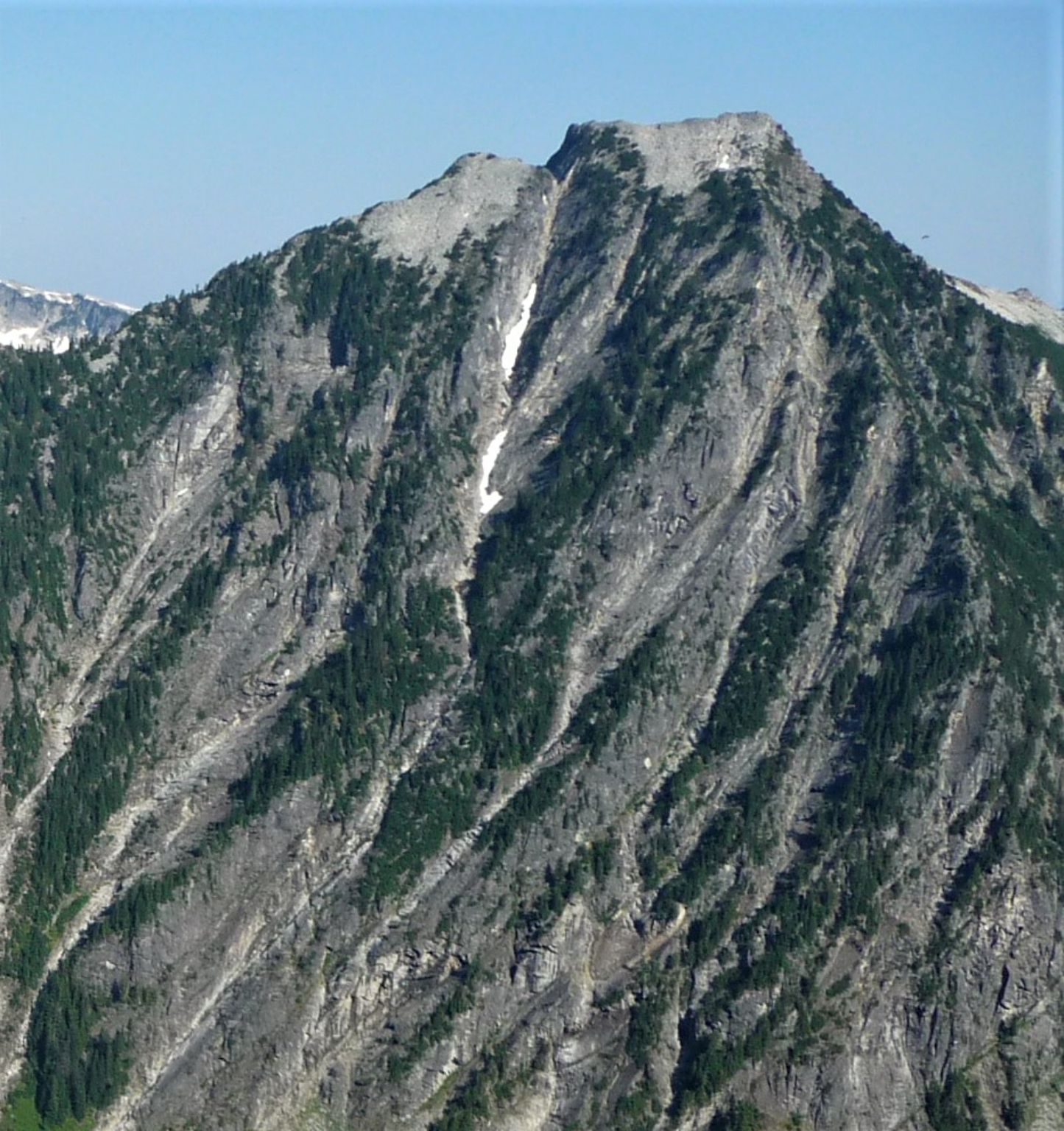
- Burnt Boot Peak, south aspect

Highest point
- Elevation: 6,540 ft (1,993 m)
- Prominence: 1,040 ft (317 m)
- Parent peak: Overcoat Peak (7,432 ft)
- Isolation: 1.33 mi (2.14 km)
- Coordinates: 47°30′03″N 121°19′39″W

Geography
- Location within Washington (state) Location within the United States
- Country: United States
- State: Washington
- County: King
- Protected area: Alpine Lakes Wilderness
- Parent range: Cascade Range
- Topo map: USGS Big Snow Mountain

Climbing
- First ascent: 1963
- Easiest route: Scrambling

Burnt Boot Peak is a 6,540-foot (1,993-metre) mountain summit located in the Alpine Lakes Wilderness in eastern King County of Washington state. The peak is part of the Cascade Range and is one mile east of the crest of the range. Burnt Boot Peak is situated 6.5 mi (10.5 km) northeast of Snoqualmie Pass on land managed by Mount Baker-Snoqualmie National Forest. Huckleberry Mountain is set 1.87 mi (3.01 km) to the south, and the nearest higher neighbor is Lemah Mountain, 1.34 mi (2.16 km) to the east. This unofficially-named mountain is located at the head of the officially-named Burnboot Creek, variant spelling Burntboot Creek. Precipitation runoff from the mountain drains south into this creek, or north into Middle Fork Snoqualmie River. The first ascent of this peak was made in August 1963 by Phil Weiser and Clarke Stockwell. The first ascent via the north ridge route was made in June 1971 by Don Williamson, Tom Oas, and Bill Bucher.

== Climate ==
Burnt Boot Peak is located in the marine west coast climate zone of western North America. Weather fronts originating in the Pacific Ocean travel northeast toward the Cascade Mountains. As fronts approach, they are forced upward by the peaks of the Cascade Range, causing them to drop their moisture in the form of rain or snow onto the Cascades (Orographic lift). As a result, the west side of the Cascades experiences high precipitation, especially during the winter months in the form of snowfall. Because of maritime influence, snow tends to be wet and heavy, resulting in high avalanche danger. During winter months, weather is usually cloudy, but due to high pressure systems over the Pacific Ocean that intensify during summer months, there is often little or no cloud cover during the summer. The months of July through September offer the most favorable weather for viewing or climbing this peak.

== Geology ==
The Alpine Lakes Wilderness features some of the most rugged topography in the Cascade Range with craggy peaks and ridges, deep glacial valleys, and granite walls spotted with over 700 mountain lakes. Geological events occurring many years ago created the diverse topography and drastic elevation changes over the Cascade Range leading to the various climate differences.

The history of the formation of the Cascade Mountains dates back millions of years ago to the late Eocene Epoch. With the North American Plate overriding the Pacific Plate, episodes of volcanic igneous activity persisted. In addition, small fragments of the oceanic and continental lithosphere called terranes created the North Cascades about 50 million years ago.

During the Pleistocene period dating back over two million years ago, glaciation advancing and retreating repeatedly scoured and shaped the landscape. The last glacial retreat in the Alpine Lakes area began about 14,000 years ago and was north of the Canada–US border by 10,000 years ago. The U-shaped cross section of the river valleys is a result of that recent glaciation. Uplift and faulting in combination with glaciation have been the dominant processes which have created the tall peaks and deep valleys of the Alpine Lakes Wilderness area.

== See also ==
- List of peaks of the Alpine Lakes Wilderness
- Geography of Washington (state)
- Geology of the Pacific Northwest

== Gallery ==
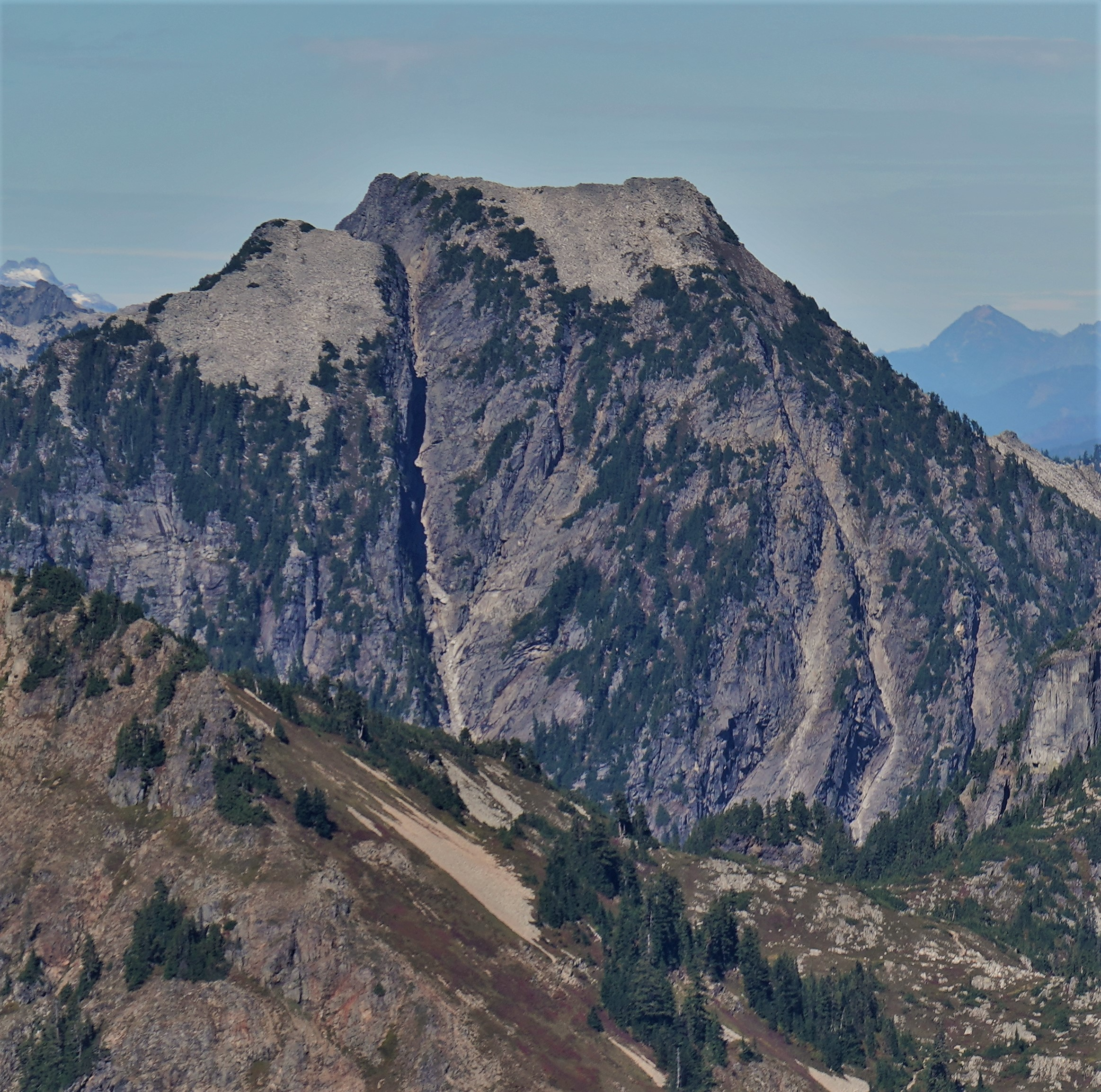
South aspect, from Alta Mountain

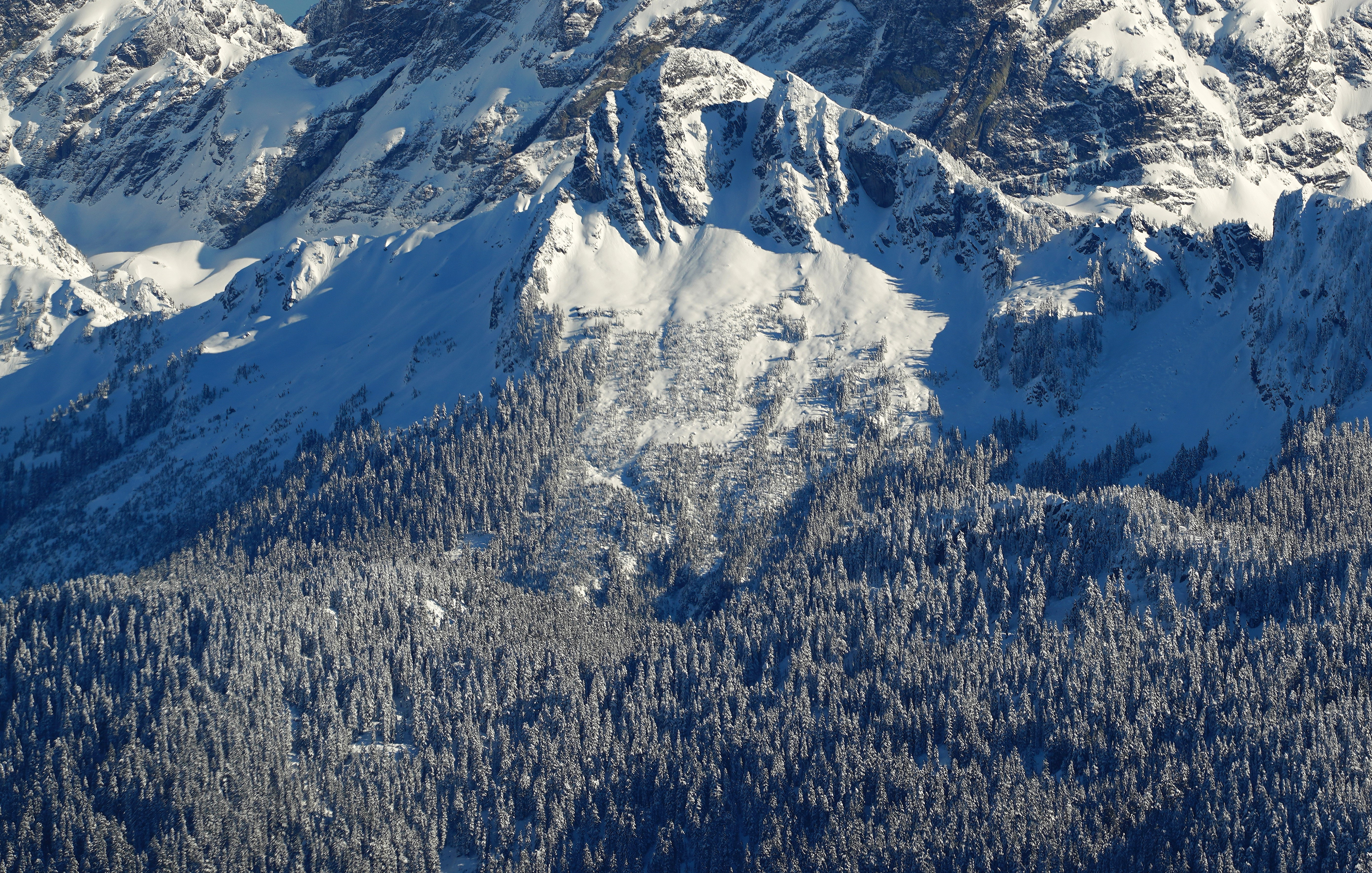
West aspect in winter, from South Bessemer Mountain

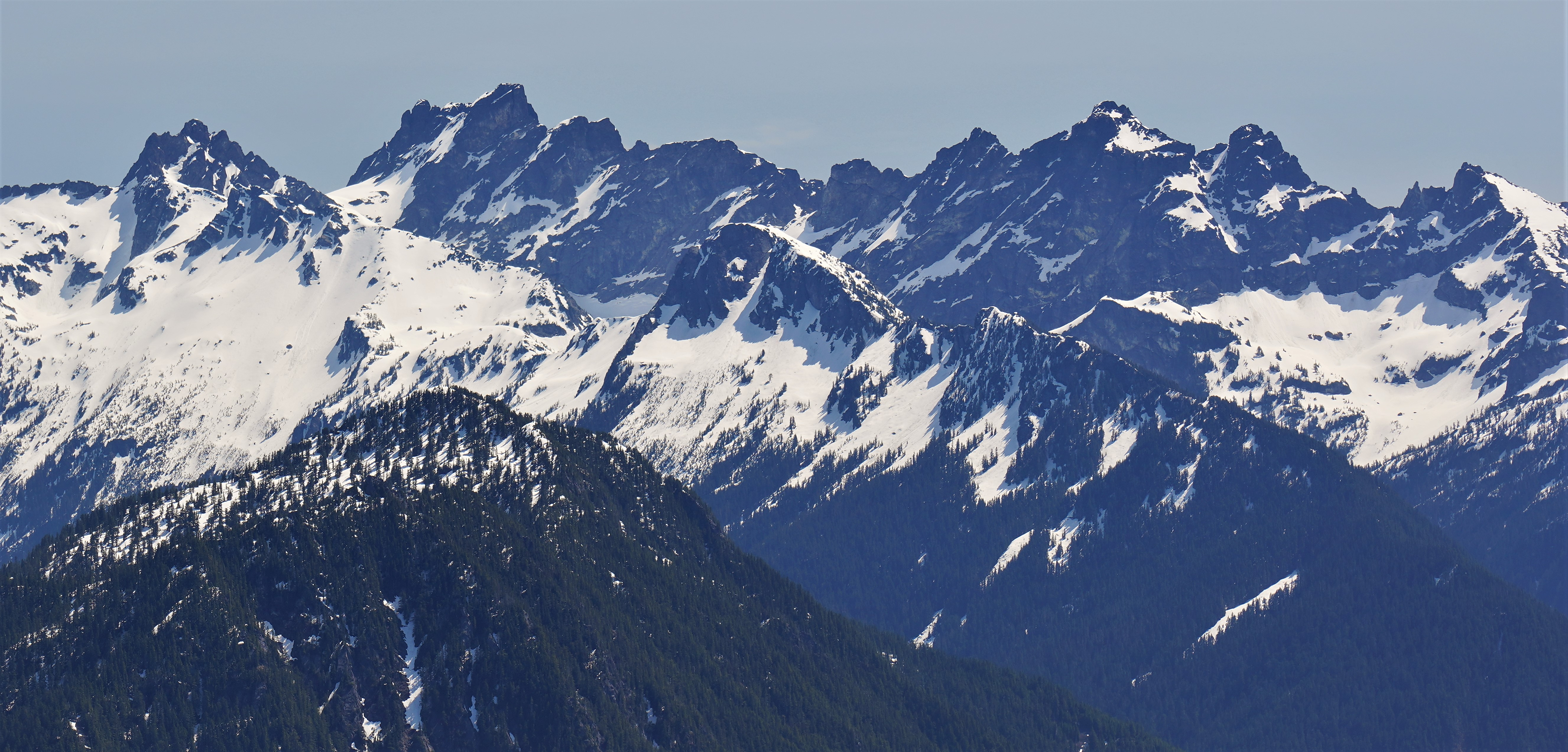
Burn Boot Peak centered, west aspect as seen from Preacher Mountain. Overcoat Peak, Chimney Rock, and Lemah Mountain in the background
