= Joe Lake (Washington) =

Lake in Washington, United States

- Location within Washington (state) Location within the United States
- Location: Kittitas County, Washington
- Coordinates: 47.4677018°N 121.3374577°W
- Basin countries: United States
- Surface area: 28.7 acres (0.116 km^{2})
- Surface elevation: 4,629 ft (1,411 m)
- Islands: 0

Joe Lake is a freshwater lake located on the eastern skirt of Alaska Mountain at the border between King County and Kittitas County, Washington. The lake is a popular area for hiking, swimming, and fishing rainbow trout and cutthroat trout. Frequently hicked Huckleberry Mountain is just north of the lake on the opposite side of the Pacific Crest Trail. Other Alpine lakes are in the vicinity, including the Rampart Lakes a short distance south, at the base of Mount Margaret. To the east is Hibox Mountain.

== Location ==
Access to Joe Lake and Alaska Mountain is through Gold Creek Trail #1314 (not maintained). The trailhead is at Gold Creek Pond on the North shore of Keechelus Lake and South of Snoqualmie Pass. Past the open meadows of slide alder and vine maple and past Alaska Lake, the trail leads to a waterfall and later Joe Lake along the creek shore. Most visitors to Joe Lake are day hikers although the lake is provided with a few primitive campsites. Gold Creek Trail connects to the Pacific Crest Trail on the north ridge of Alaska and Joe Lake, while Edds Lake is on the opposite side of the PCT.

== See also ==
- List of lakes of the Alpine Lakes Wilderness
