= Alaska Mountain =

Mountain in Washington (state), United States

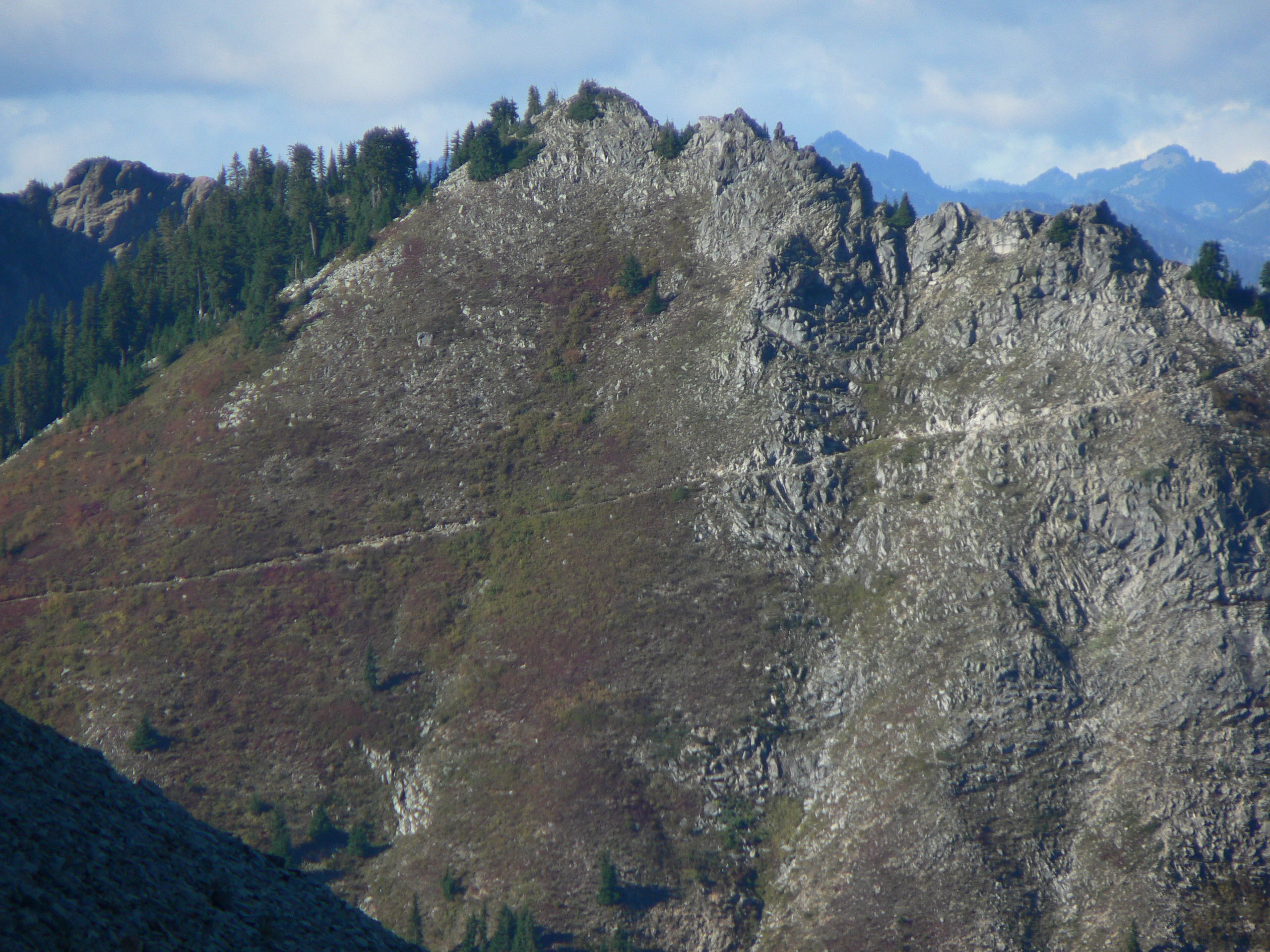
- Alaska Mountain, southern aspect

Highest point
- Elevation: 5,745 ft (1,751 m)
- Prominence: 505 ft (154 m)
- Coordinates: 47°27′50″N 121°20′46″W

Geography
- Location within Washington (state) Location within the United States
- Interactive map of Alaska Mountain
- Country: United States
- State: Washington
- County: Kittitas
- Protected area: Alpine Lakes Wilderness
- Parent range: Cascade Range
- Topo map: USGS Chikamin Peak

Climbing
- Easiest route: Hiking

Alaska Mountain is a 5,745-foot (1,751-metre) mountain summit located in the Cascade Range, in Kittitas County of Washington state. It is situated within the Alpine Lakes Wilderness on land managed by Wenatchee National Forest. Alaska Mountain is set between Alaska Lake and Joe Lake, 8 miles (13 km) northeast of Snoqualmie Pass, and 0.81 miles (1.30 km) southeast of Mount Thomson, which is also its nearest higher peak. The Pacific Crest Trail traverses around the south, east and north slopes of Alaska Mountain, and an off-trail hike leads to the summit. Precipitation runoff on the east side of the mountain drains into tributaries of the Yakima River, whereas the west side of the peak drains into tributaries of the Snoqualmie River.

== Climate ==
Alaska Mountain is located in the marine west coast climate zone of western North America. Weather fronts originating in the Pacific Ocean travel northeast toward the Cascade Mountains. As fronts approach, they are forced upward by the peaks of the Cascade Range, causing them to drop their moisture in the form of rain or snow onto the Cascades (Orographic lift). As a result, the west side of the Cascades experiences high precipitation, especially during the winter months in the form of snowfall. Because of maritime influence, snow tends to be wet and heavy, resulting in high avalanche danger. During winter months, weather is usually cloudy, but, due to high pressure systems over the Pacific Ocean that intensify during summer months, there is often little or no cloud cover during the summer.

== Geology ==
The Alpine Lakes Wilderness features some of the most rugged topography in the Cascade Range with craggy peaks and ridges, deep glacial valleys, and granite walls spotted with over 700 mountain lakes. Geological events occurring many years ago created the diverse topography and drastic elevation changes over the Cascade Range leading to the various climate differences. These climate differences lead to vegetation variety defining the ecoregions in this area. The elevation range of this area is between about 1,000 feet (300 m) in the lower elevations to over 9,000 feet (2,700 m) on Mount Stuart.

The history of the formation of the Cascade Mountains dates back millions of years ago to the late Eocene Epoch. With the North American Plate overriding the Pacific Plate, episodes of volcanic igneous activity persisted. In addition, small fragments of the oceanic and continental lithosphere called terranes created the North Cascades about 50 million years ago.

During the Pleistocene period dating back over two million years ago, glaciation advancing and retreating repeatedly scoured the landscape leaving deposits of rock debris. The last glacial retreat in the Alpine Lakes area began about 14,000 years ago and was north of the Canada–US border by 10,000 years ago. The U-shaped cross section of the river valleys is a result of that recent glaciation. Uplift and faulting in combination with glaciation have been the dominant processes which have created the tall peaks and deep valleys of the Alpine Lakes Wilderness area.

== Gallery ==
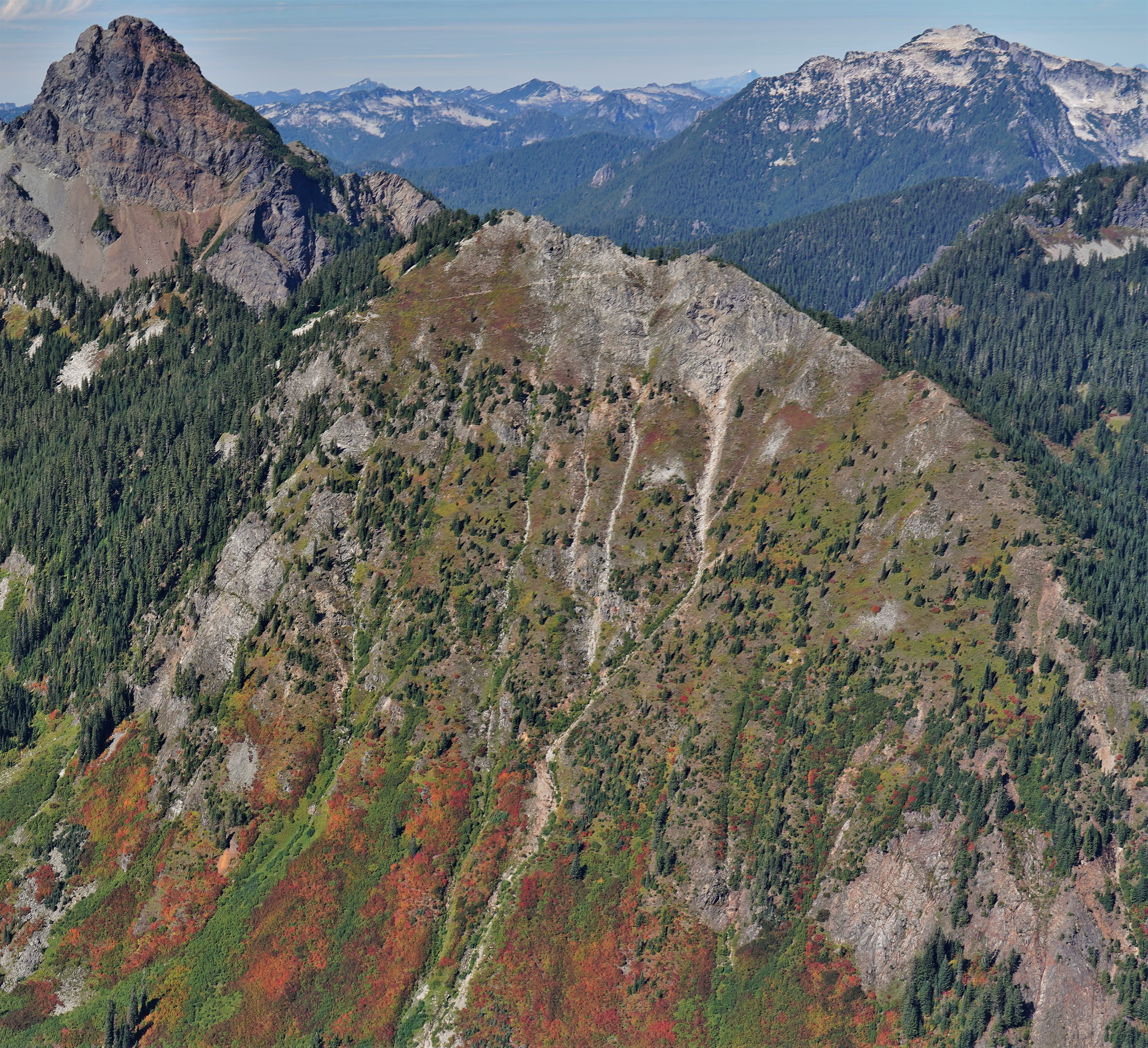
Alaska Mountain from Alta Mountain

== See also ==
- List of peaks of the Alpine Lakes Wilderness
- Geography of Washington (state)
- Geology of the Pacific Northwest
