= Huckleberry Mountain (Washington) =

Mountain in Washington (state), United States

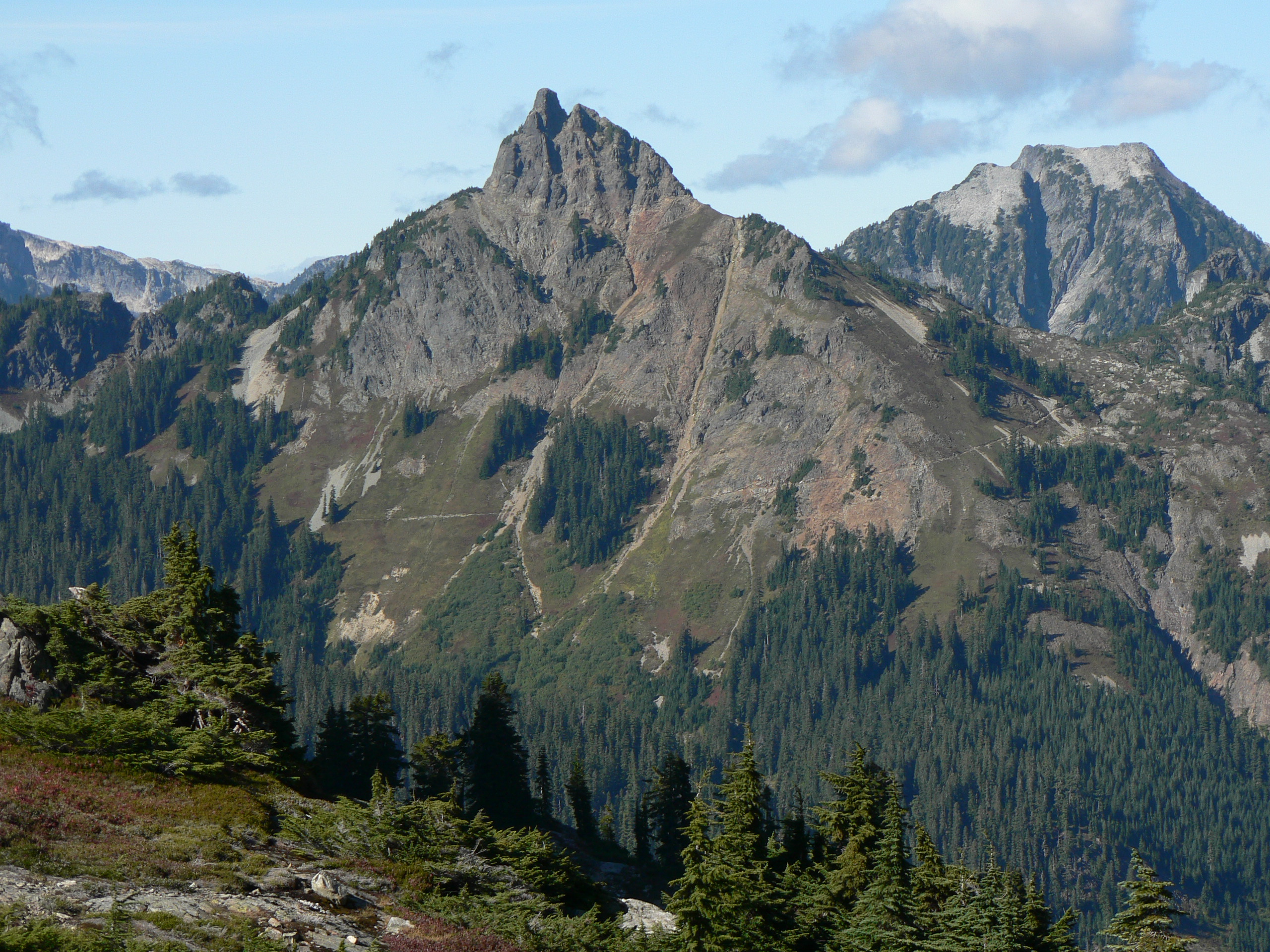
- Huckleberry Mountain centered (Burnt Boot Peak to right)

Highest point
- Elevation: 6,320 ft (1,930 m)
- Prominence: 720 ft (220 m)
- Parent peak: Chikamin Peak (7,000+ ft)
- Isolation: 1.08 mi (1.74 km)
- Coordinates: 47°28′27″N 121°20′02″W

Geography
- Location within Washington (state) Location within the United States
- Country: United States
- State: Washington
- County: King / Kittitas
- Protected area: Alpine Lakes Wilderness
- Parent range: Cascade Range
- Topo map: USGS Chikamin Peak

Geology
- Rock type: Andesite

Climbing
- First ascent: May 1915 by Charles Hazelhurst and Thomas Acheson
- Easiest route: class 4 scrambling

Huckleberry Mountain is a 6,320+ ft (1,930+ m) summit located on the shared border of King County and Kittitas County in Washington state.

== Description ==
Huckleberry Mountain is part of the Cascade Range and is set within the Alpine Lakes Wilderness on land managed by Mount Baker-Snoqualmie National Forest. Huckleberry Mountain is northeast of Snoqualmie Pass and 0.77 mile west of Chikamin Peak, which is the nearest higher neighbor. The Pacific Crest Trail traverses the south and east slope of Huckleberry Mountain, and from the trail a class 4 scramble leads to the summit. Precipitation runoff on the east side of the mountain drains into tributaries of the Yakima River, whereas the west side of the peak drains into tributaries of the Snoqualmie River. Topographic relief is significant as the summit rises 3,300 feet (1,000 meters) above Burnboot Creek in one mile. This mountain's toponym has been officially adopted by the U.S. Board on Geographic Names.

== Climate ==
Huckleberry Mountain is located in the marine west coast climate zone of western North America. Most weather fronts originate in the Pacific Ocean, and travel northeast toward the Cascade Mountains. As fronts approach, they are forced upward by the peaks of the Cascade Range, causing them to drop their moisture in the form of rain or snowfall onto the Cascades (Orographic lift). As a result, the west side of the Cascades experiences high precipitation, especially during the winter months in the form of snowfall. During winter months, weather is usually cloudy, but, due to high pressure systems over the Pacific Ocean that intensify during summer months, there is often little or no cloud cover during the summer. Because of maritime influence, snow tends to be wet and heavy, resulting in high avalanche danger. The months July through September offer the most favorable weather for viewing or climbing this peak.

== Geology ==
The Alpine Lakes Wilderness features some of the most rugged topography in the Cascade Range with craggy peaks and ridges, deep glacial valleys, and granite walls spotted with over 700 mountain lakes. Geological events occurring many years ago created the diverse topography and drastic elevation changes over the Cascade Range leading to the various climate differences. These climate differences lead to vegetation variety defining the ecoregions in this area. The elevation range of this area is between about 1,000 feet (300 m) in the lower elevations to over 9,000 feet (2,700 m) on Mount Stuart.

The history of the formation of the Cascade Mountains dates back millions of years ago to the late Eocene Epoch. With the North American Plate overriding the Pacific Plate, episodes of volcanic igneous activity persisted. In addition, small fragments of the oceanic and continental lithosphere called terranes created the North Cascades about 50 million years ago.

During the Pleistocene period dating back over two million years ago, glaciation advancing and retreating repeatedly scoured the landscape leaving deposits of rock debris. The last glacial retreat in the Alpine Lakes area began about 14,000 years ago and was north of the Canada–US border by 10,000 years ago. The U-shaped cross section of the river valleys is a result of that recent glaciation. Uplift and faulting in combination with glaciation have been the dominant processes which have created the tall peaks and deep valleys of the Alpine Lakes Wilderness area.

== Gallery ==
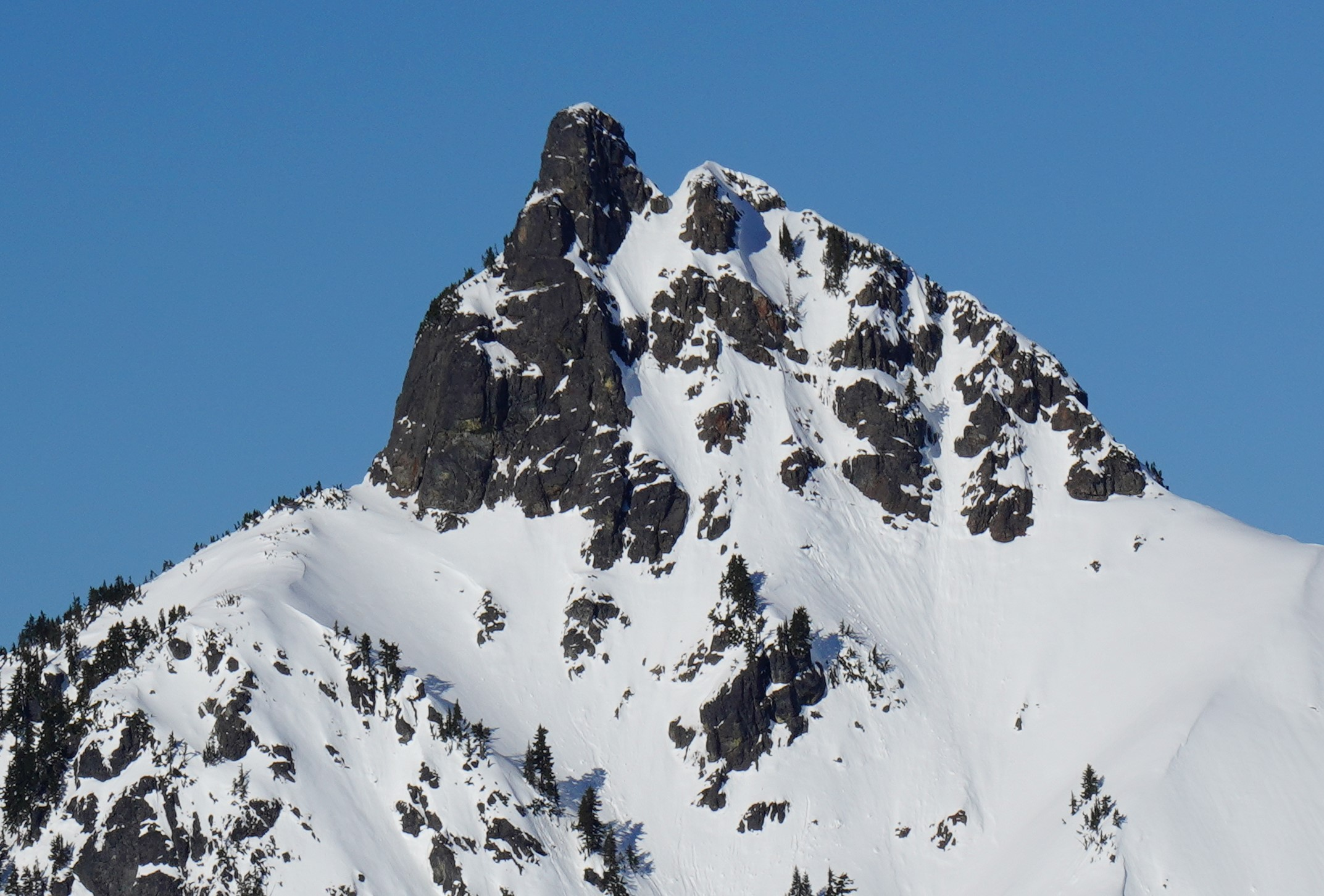
Huckleberry Mountain

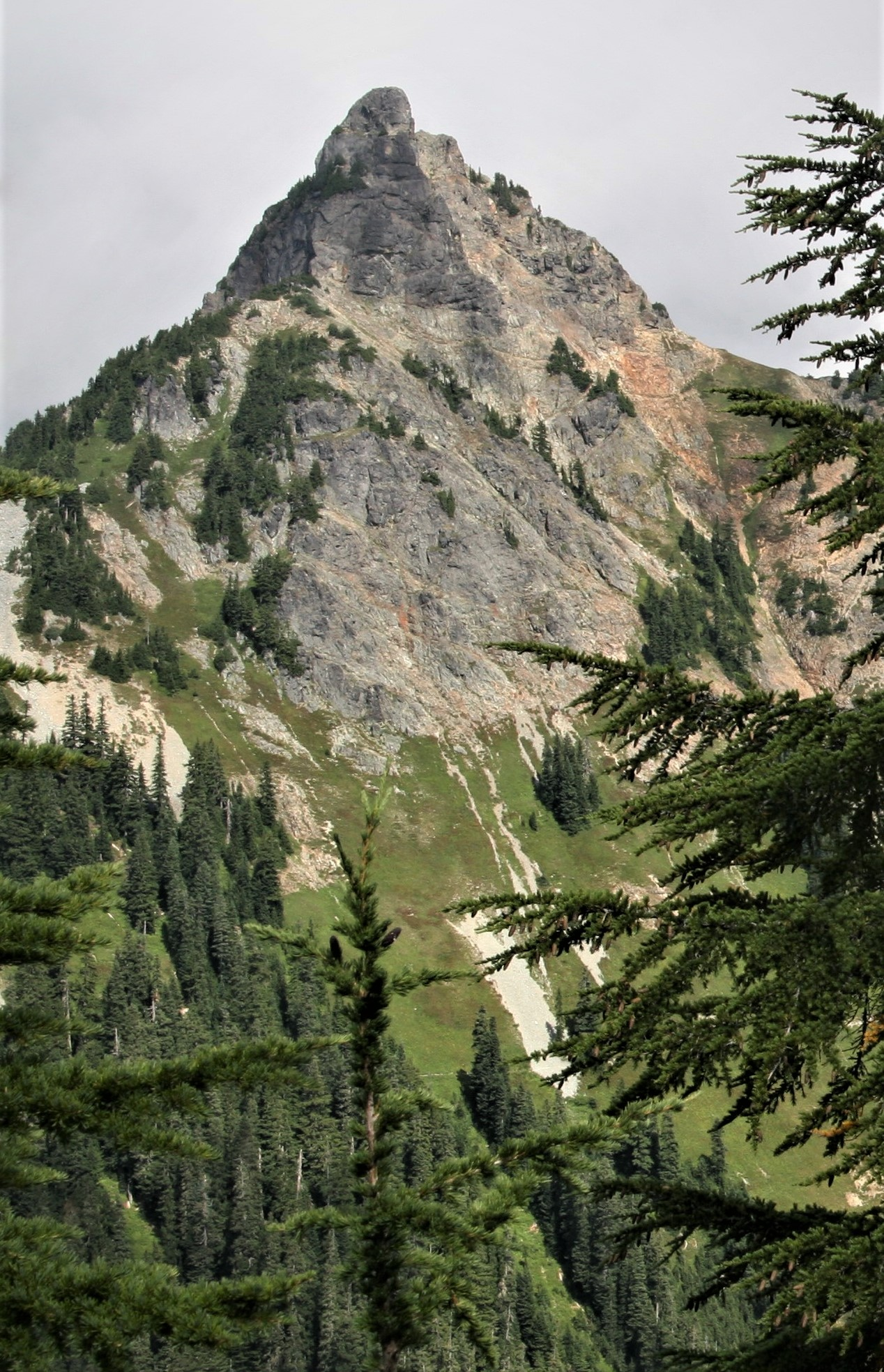
Huckleberry from southwest

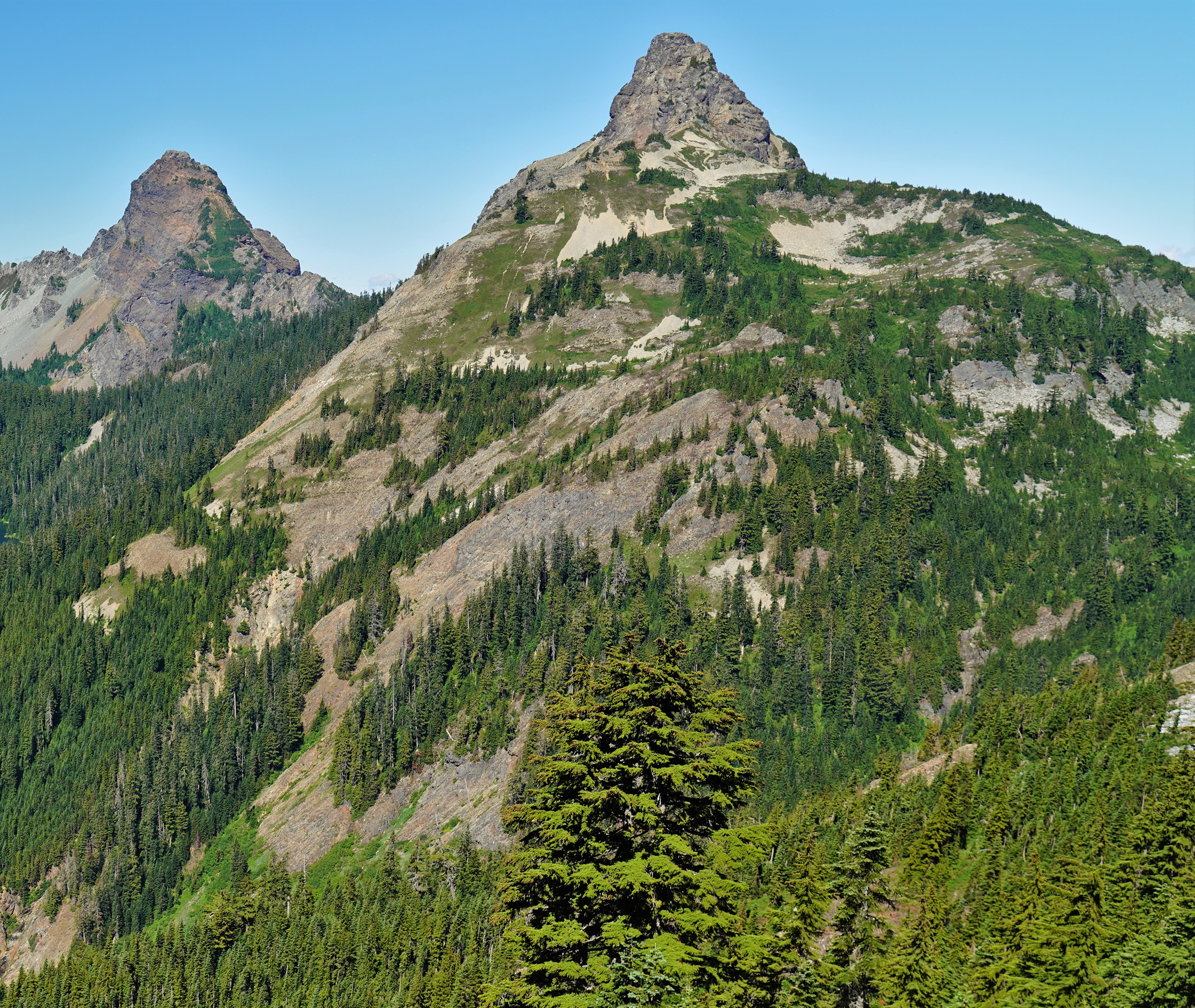
East aspect of Huckleberry Mountain, with Mount Thomson to left.

== See also ==
- List of peaks of the Alpine Lakes Wilderness
