= Alaska Lake =

Lake in Washington, United States

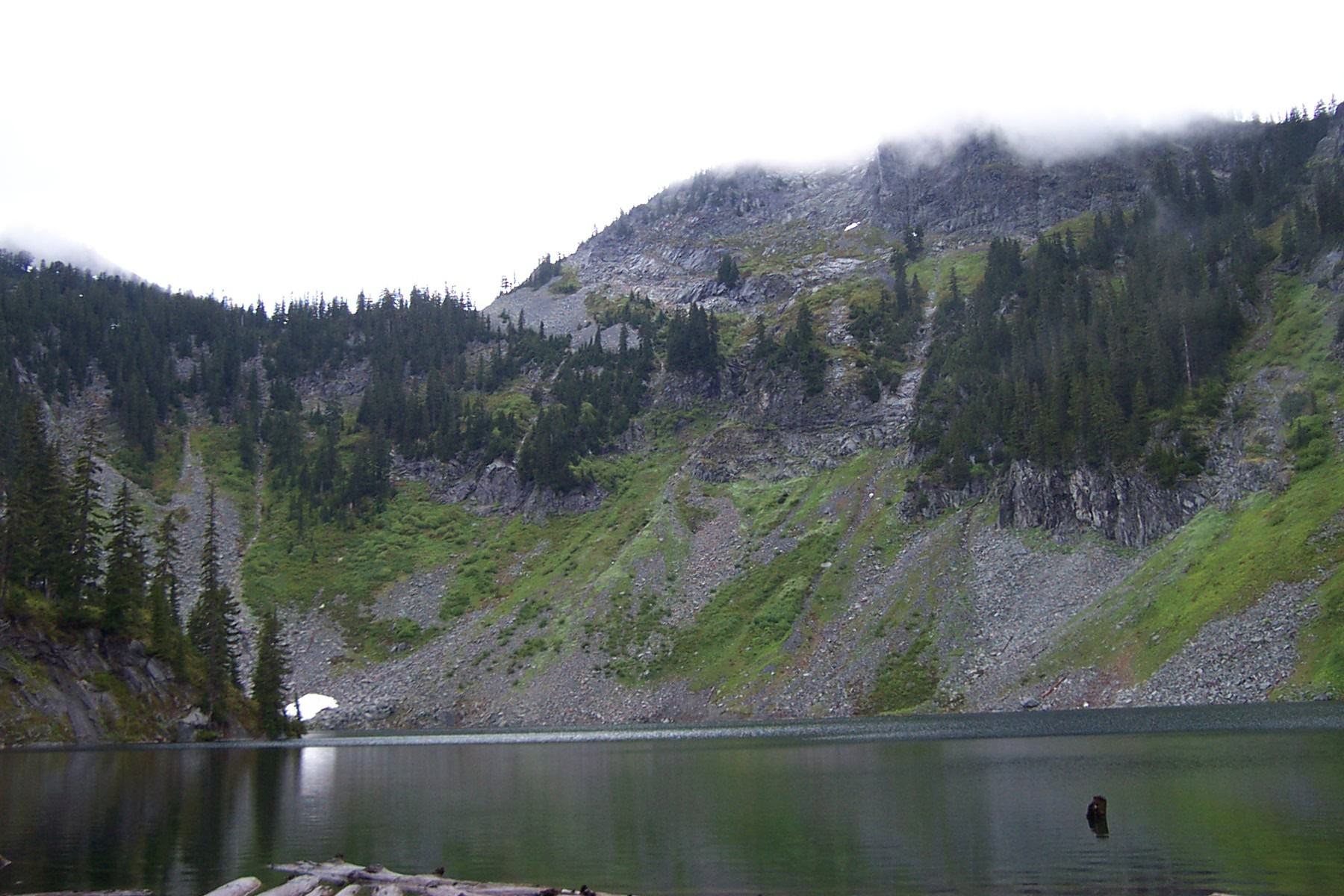

- Location within Washington (state) Location within the United States
- Location: Kittitas County, Washington
- Coordinates: 47.45974°N 121.35649°W
- Basin countries: United States
- Surface elevation: 4,213 ft (1,284 m)
- Islands: 0

Alaska Lake is a freshwater lake located on the western skirt of Alaska Mountain at the border between King County and Kittitas County, Washington. The lake is a popular area for hiking, swimming, and fishing. Other Alpine lakes are in the vicinity, including the Rampart Lakes a short distance south, at the base of Mount Margaret. To the east is Hibox Mountain.

== Location ==
Access to Alaska Lake and Alaska Mountain is through Gold Creek Trail #1314. The trailhead is at Gold Creek Pond on the North shore of Keechelus Lake and South of Snoqualmie Pass. Towards the open meadows of slide alder and vine maple, the trail leads to a waterfall and later Joe Lake. Most visitors to Alaska Lake are day hikers although the lake is provided with campsites. Gold Creek Trail connects to the Pacific Crest Trail on the north ridge of Alaska Lake.

== Climate ==
Alaska Lake is located in a hemiboreal climate, part of the marine west coast climate zone of western North America. The average temperature is 3 °C. The warmest month is August, with an average temperature of 16 °C, and the coldest month is January, at an average of −6 °C. The average rainfall is 1687 millimeters per year. The wettest month is January, with 396 millimeters of rain, and the least in July, with 38 millimeters of rain.

Rampart Lakes

Climate chart (precipitation, max. and min. temperature)
J	F	M	A	M	J	J	A	S	O	N	D
396 −1 −10	354 −1 −10	343 4 −8	213 9 −4	165 15 −2	104 18 0	38 24 3	48 20 12	114 12 −2	298 4 −7	353 0 −5	370 −1 −11
- █ Average max. and min. temperatures in °C
- █ Precipitation totals in mm
Imperial conversion
J	F	M	A	M	J	J	A	S	O	N	D
16 30 14	14 30 14	14 39 18	8.4 48 25	6.5 59 28	4.1 64 32	1.5 75 37	1.9 68 54	4.5 54 28	12 39 19	14 32 23	15 30 12
- █ Average max. and min. temperatures in °F
- █ Precipitation totals in inches

== See also ==
- List of lakes of the Alpine Lakes Wilderness
