= Mount Thomson =

Mountain in Washington (state), United States

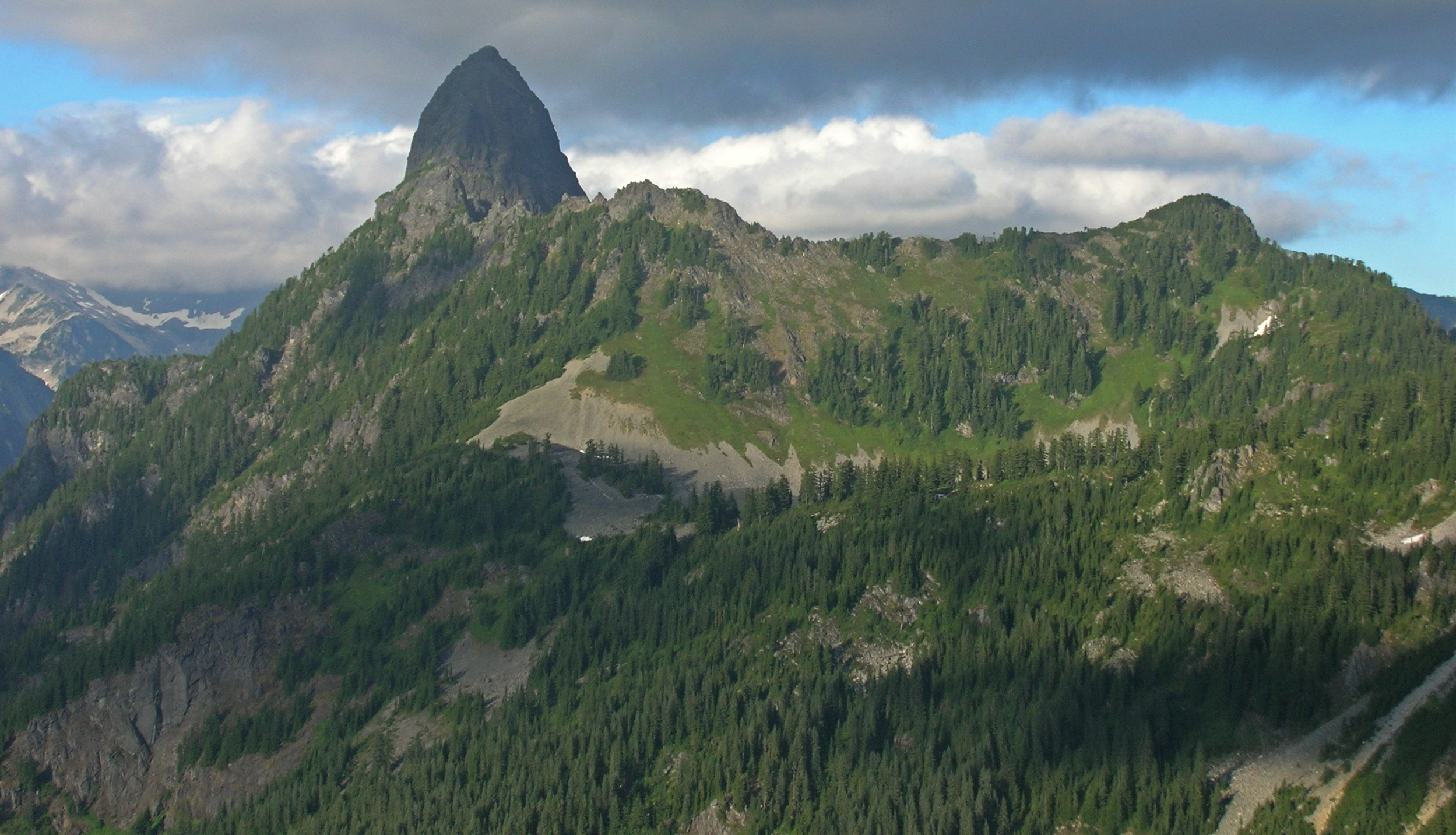
- Mount Thomson

Highest point
- Elevation: 6,554 ft (1,998 m)
- Prominence: 1,514 ft (461 m)
- Parent peak: Chikamin Peak
- Isolation: 2.33 mi (3.75 km)
- Coordinates: 47°28′20″N 121°21′39″W

Geography
- Location within Washington (state) Location within the United States
- Country: United States
- State: Washington
- County: King
- Protected area: Alpine Lakes Wilderness
- Parent range: Cascade Range
- Topo map: USGS Chikamin Peak

Geology
- Rock type: Keechelus andesite

Climbing
- First ascent: 1917 Joe Hazard, B. French
- Easiest route: Scrambling East Ridge

Mount Thomson is a prominent 6,554-foot-elevation (1,998-meter) mountain summit in eastern King County of Washington state.

== Description ==
Mount Thomson is part of the Cascade Range and is a half-mile east of the crest of the range. Thomson is situated 4 mi (6.4 km) northeast of Snoqualmie Pass in the Alpine Lakes Wilderness, on land managed by Mount Baker-Snoqualmie National Forest. Precipitation runoff on the mountain drains into the Middle Fork of Snoqualmie River. The nearest peak is Alaska Mountain 0.81 mi (1.30 km) to the southeast, and the nearest higher peak is Chikamin Peak, 2.08 mi (3.35 km) to the east. The mountain was named for Reginald Heber Thomson (1856-1949), a Seattle city engineer who reshaped the face of Seattle. This landform's toponym was spelled "Thompson" until the correct spelling was officially adopted in 1981 by the U.S. Board on Geographic Names. The first ascent of the peak was made in 1917 by Joe Hazard and B. French.

== Climate ==
Mount Thomson is located in the marine west coast climate zone of western North America. Most weather fronts originating in the Pacific Ocean travel northeast toward the Cascade Mountains. As fronts approach, they are forced upward by the peaks of the Cascade Range, causing them to drop their moisture in the form of rain or snow onto the Cascades (Orographic lift). As a result, the west side of the Cascades experiences high precipitation, especially during the winter months in the form of snowfall. Because of maritime influence, snow tends to be wet and heavy, resulting in high avalanche danger. During winter months, weather is usually cloudy, but due to high pressure systems over the Pacific Ocean that intensify during summer months, there is often little or no cloud cover during the summer. The months of July through September offer the most favorable weather for viewing or climbing this peak.

== Geology ==
The Alpine Lakes Wilderness features some of the most rugged topography in the Cascade Range with craggy peaks and ridges, deep glacial valleys, and granite walls spotted with over 700 mountain lakes. Geological events occurring many years ago created the diverse topography and drastic elevation changes over the Cascade Range leading to the various climate differences.

The history of the formation of the Cascade Mountains dates back millions of years ago to the late Eocene Epoch. With the North American Plate overriding the Pacific Plate, episodes of volcanic igneous activity persisted. In addition, small fragments of the oceanic and continental lithosphere called terranes created the North Cascades about 50 million years ago.

During the Pleistocene period dating back over two million years ago, glaciation advancing and retreating repeatedly scoured and shaped the landscape. The last glacial retreat in the Alpine Lakes area began about 14,000 years ago and was north of the Canada–US border by 10,000 years ago. The U-shaped cross section of the river valleys is a result of that recent glaciation. Uplift and faulting in combination with glaciation have been the dominant processes which have created the tall peaks and deep valleys of the Alpine Lakes Wilderness area.

== Gallery ==
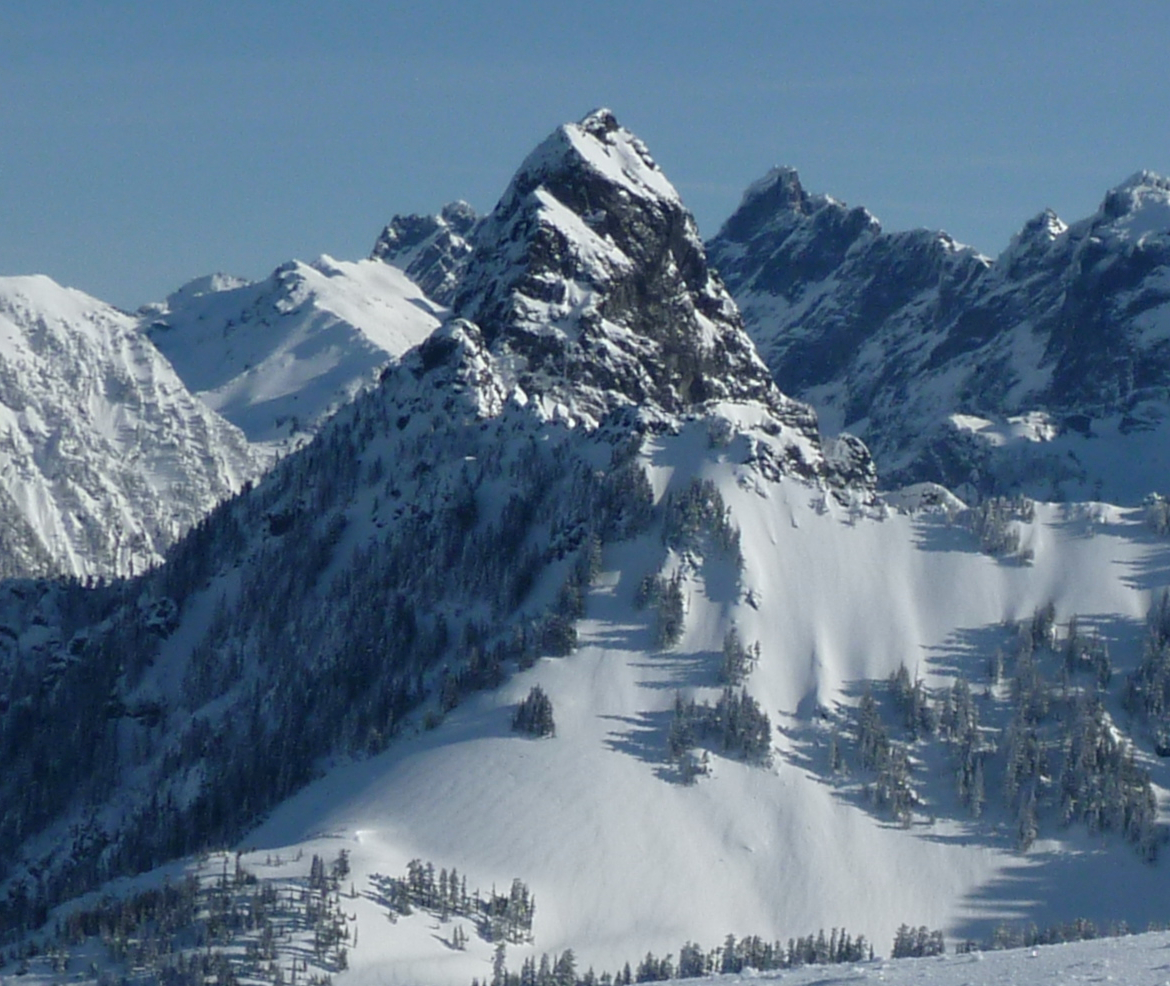
Mount Thomson in winter

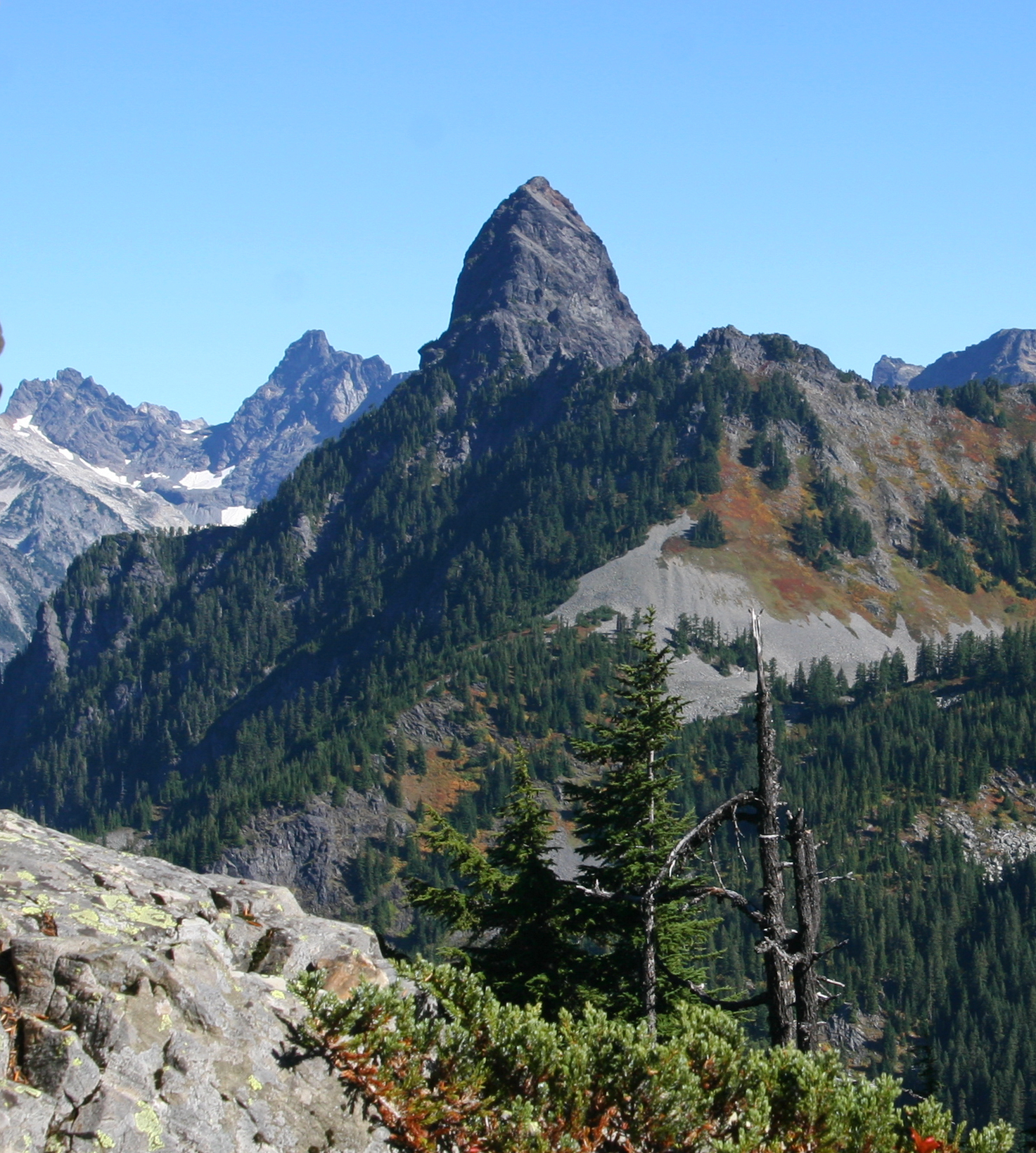
Mount Thomson

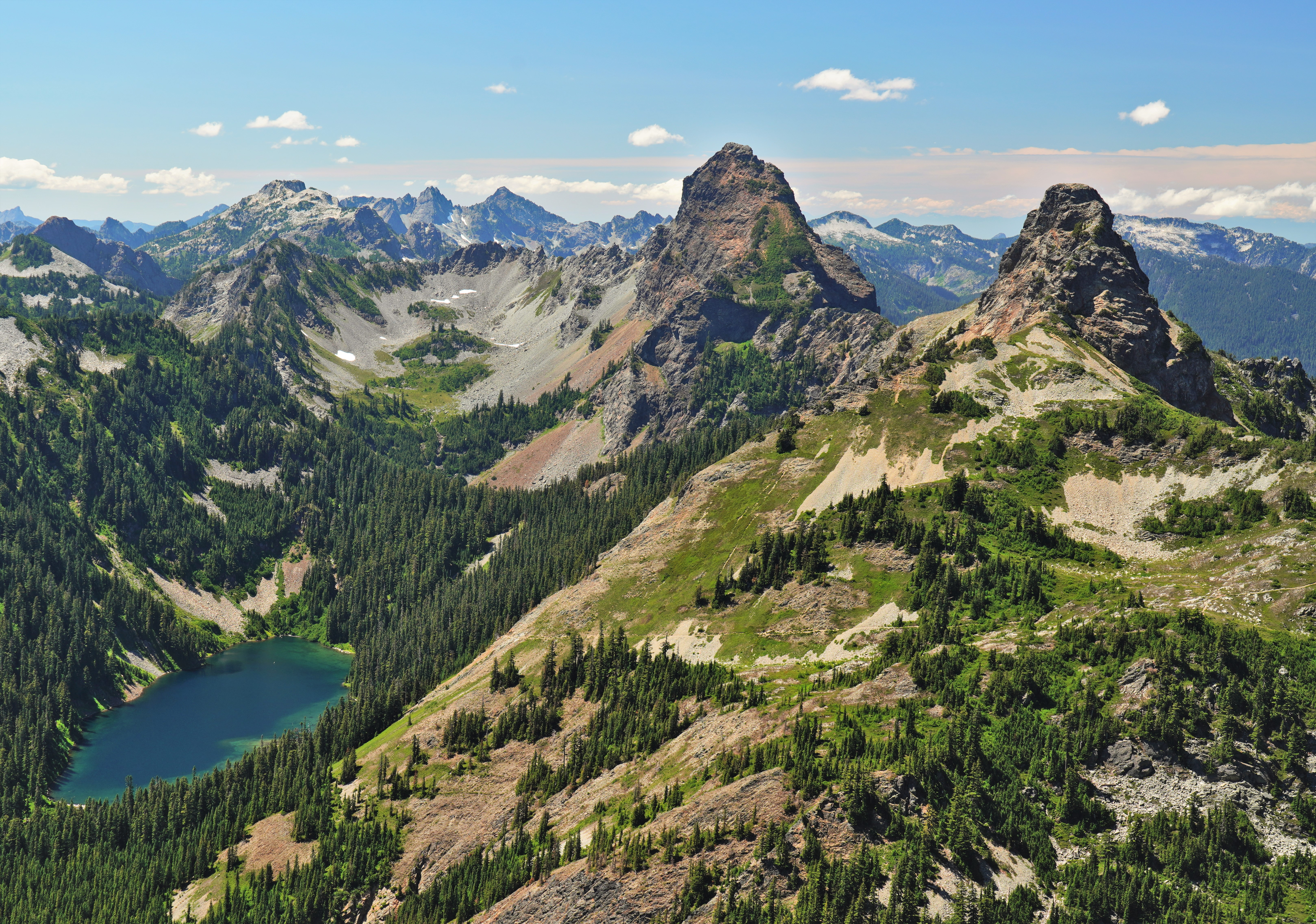
Joe Lake, Mt. Thomson, Huckleberry Mountain (right).
Camera pointed west.

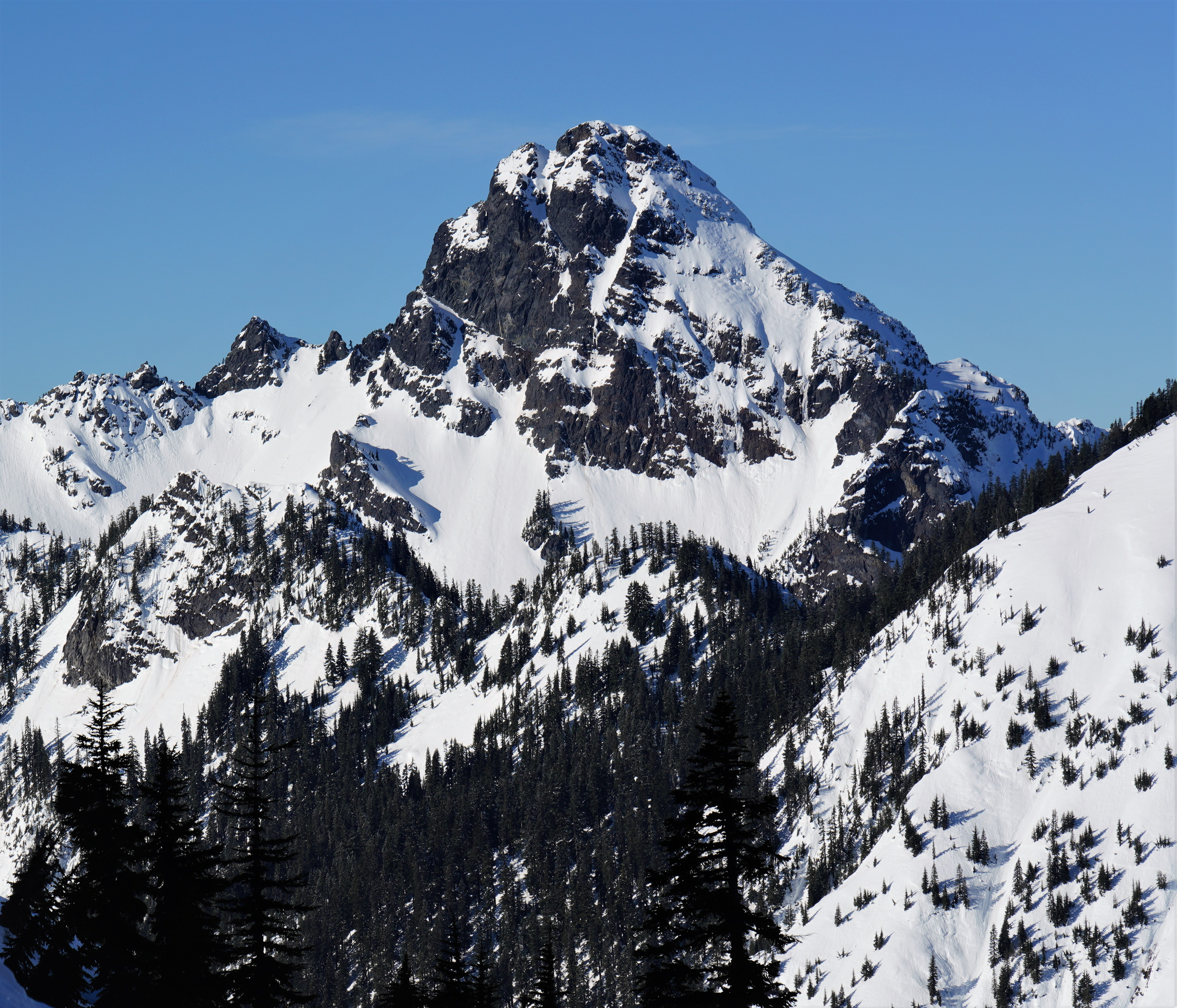
Mount Thomson

== See also ==
- List of peaks of the Alpine Lakes Wilderness
- Geography of Washington (state)
- Geology of the Pacific Northwest
