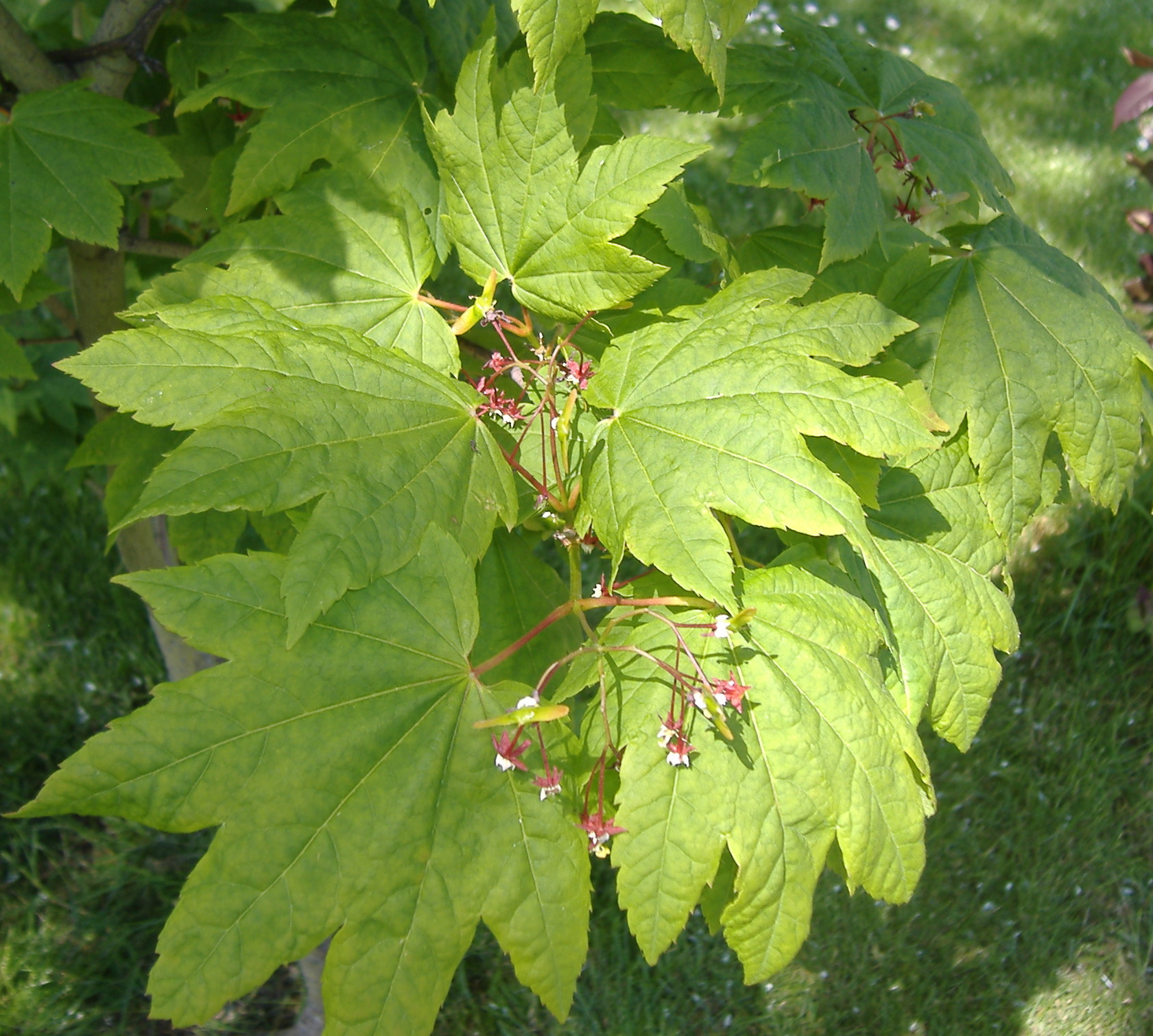
- Vine maple leaves and flowers

Conservation status
- Least Concern (IUCN 3.1)

Scientific classification
- Kingdom: Plantae
- Clade: Tracheophytes
- Clade: Angiosperms
- Clade: Eudicots
- Clade: Rosids
- Order: Sapindales
- Family: Sapindaceae
- Genus: Acer
- Section: Acer sect. Palmata
- Series: Acer ser. Palmata
- Species: A. circinatum

Binomial name
- Acer circinatum Pursh
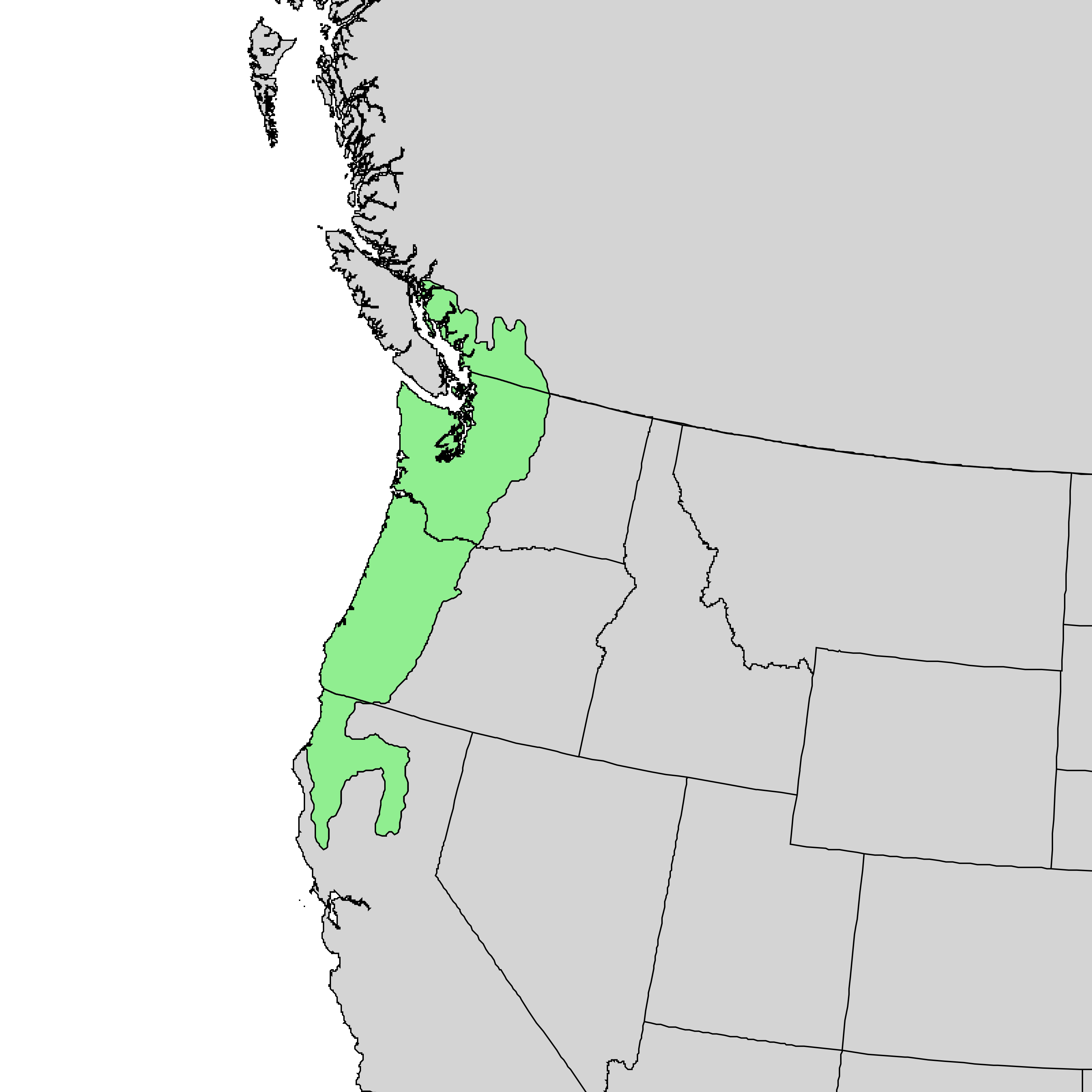
- Natural range

Synonyms
- Acer macounii Greene; Acer modocense Greene; Acer virgatum Raf.

= Acer circinatum =

Vine maple

Species of maple

Acer circinatum, or vine maple, is a species of maple native to northwestern North America. Vine maple typically grows as a low-elevation coastal tree in temperate areas of high precipitation such as the west coast of Oregon and northern California, as well as the temperate rainforests of Washington and British Columbia. Vine maples play an important role in conserving the biodiversity of lowland ecosystems by enriching upper soil layers and providing habitat for other organisms.

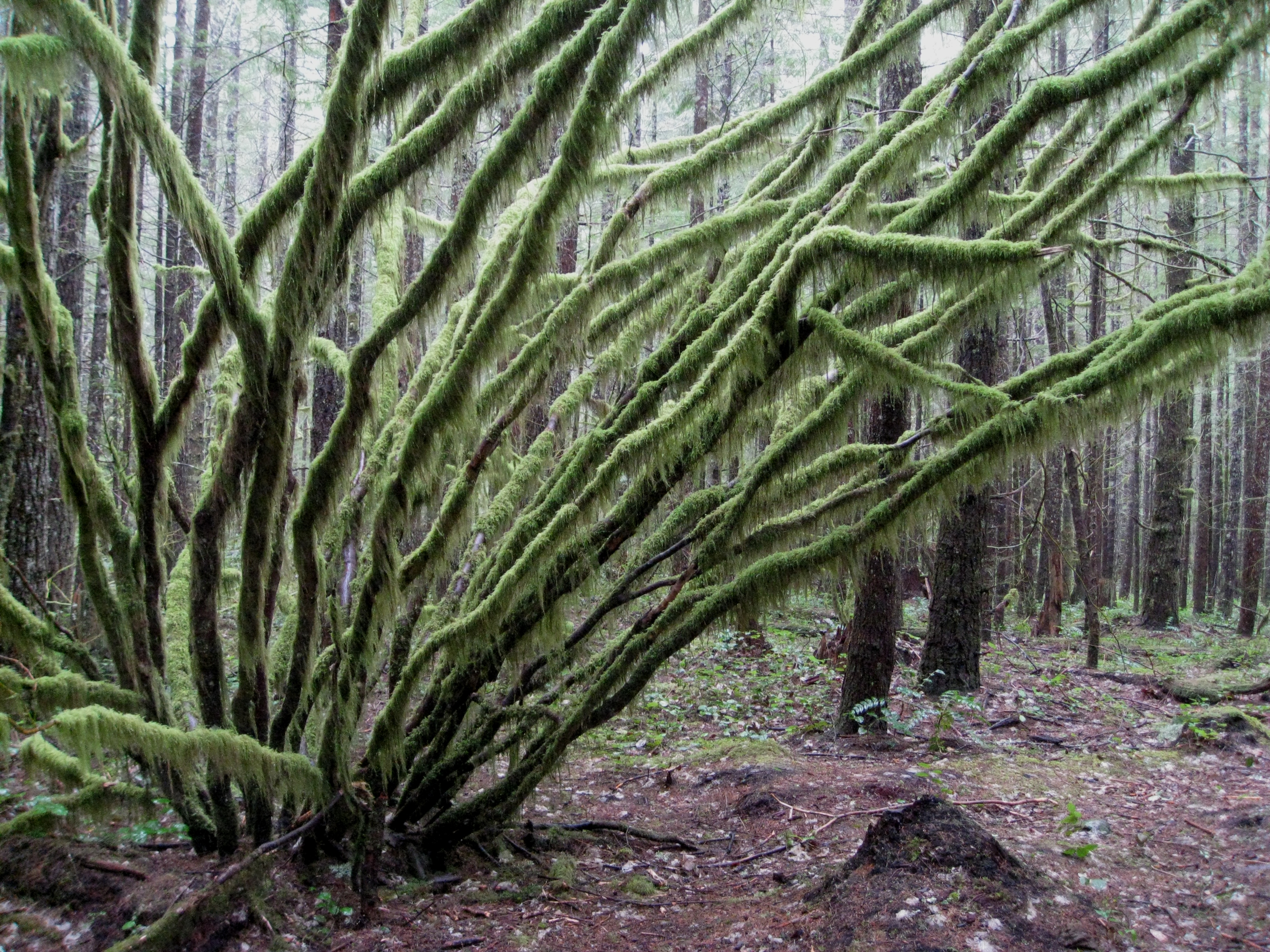
An example of a vine maple with many stems growing from the root ball. Vine maples are epiphyte hotspots, as demonstrated by the moss-covered branches of this specimen.

== Description ==
Acer circinatum grows as a many-stemmed shrub-like tree. It most commonly reaches a height between 5 and 8 meters (16 and 26 ft), but can occasionally reach 18 meters (59 feet). It commonly grows as a spray of slender stems from 3–10 cm (1–4 in), but in more tree-like specimens the trunk can reach 25 cm (10 in). Shoots are slender with smooth, hairless bark.

Vine maple leaves are coarsely toothed and 3 to 14 cm (1 1/4 to 5 1/2 in) in length. They are palmately lobed with 7–11 lobes, the lobe-points forming a nearly circular pattern. In the autumn, the leaves turn bright yellow to orange red. Vine maples produce single flowers (a single flower is a flower that produces one fruit) that are 6–9 mm (1/4–3/8 in) in diameter, with dark red sepals and 5 yellow petals. The fruit, a two-seeded winged samara, is adapted for wind-dispersal. Each wing is 2–4 cm in length, and holds a seed approximately 9 mm (3/8 in) in diameter.

Vine maple trees can grow by cloning, which happens when a new shoot develops from a root or branch of the tree. Occasionally, flexible vine maple branches will bend over and grow into the ground to form natural arch. This cloning characteristic, known as layering, allows vine maple stands to grow quickly, and makes vine maple a good contender for secondary succession after a woodland overstorey (canopy) disturbance.

== Taxonomy ==
Acer circinatum is part of the Palmatum group of maple native to East Asia and North America with its closest relatives being Acer japonicum (fullmoon maple) and Acer pseudosieboldianum (Korean maple).

== Distribution and habitat ==
Acer circinatum can be found from southwest British Columbia to northern California, usually within 300 km (190 mi) of the Pacific Ocean, specifically along the Columbia Gorge and throughout coastal forests. It is found no further inland than the east side of the Cascade Range. In the Fraser Canyon, it grows as far north as Chapmans.Acer circinatum is most often found growing interspersed within conifer forests of Douglas fir (Pseudotsuga menziesii), Hemlock (Tsuga heterophylla), and Cedar (Thuja plicata). Vine maples are also known to occasionally establish small colonial gaps within conifer forests, where they proliferate after an overstorey disturbance (such as the death of a large tree), and are able to maintain the gap by preventing the re-establishment of larger trees.

== Ecology ==
Various birds, such as nuthatches, chickadees, grosbeaks, warblers, waxwings, vireos, and woodpeckers eat the seeds of this species, as well as mammals such as squirrels and chipmunks. Deer and elk also browse the foliage, and beavers will eat the bark of young specimens. Vine maples also host a variety of epiphytes (non parasitic organisms that grow on other organisms) such as mosses and lichens. Though small compared to the conifer forests they inhabit, vine maples are a good contender for forest resources. Due to the speed at which they grow and spread, vine maples are able to establish and maintain dominance in natural forest clearings and quickly colonize new openings in the canopy caused by tree mortality. Vine maples are an important member of the forest ecosystems of the Pacific Northwest because they cycle nutrients more quickly than conifers do, and therefore create thinner, more nutrient-rich forest floor layers that promote biodiversity. Vine maples drop more leaf litter than conifers, and their leaves decompose faster, leading to higher concentrations of N, P Ca, Mg, K, Fe, and Zn near the surface of the forest floor.

== History ==
Acer circinatum likely entered western North America in the mid Pliocene (5.3-2.6 mya). Despite its isolation from many of the Asian species with which it shares a common ancestor, Acer circinatum has not diverged significantly from its Asian relatives in either appearance or genetics.

== Cultivation ==
It is occasionally cultivated outside its native range as an ornamental tree, from Juneau, Alaska, and Ottawa, Ontario, to Huntsville, Alabama, and also in northwestern Europe.

== Uses ==
The Quinault people used the shoots to weave baskets.

== Gallery ==
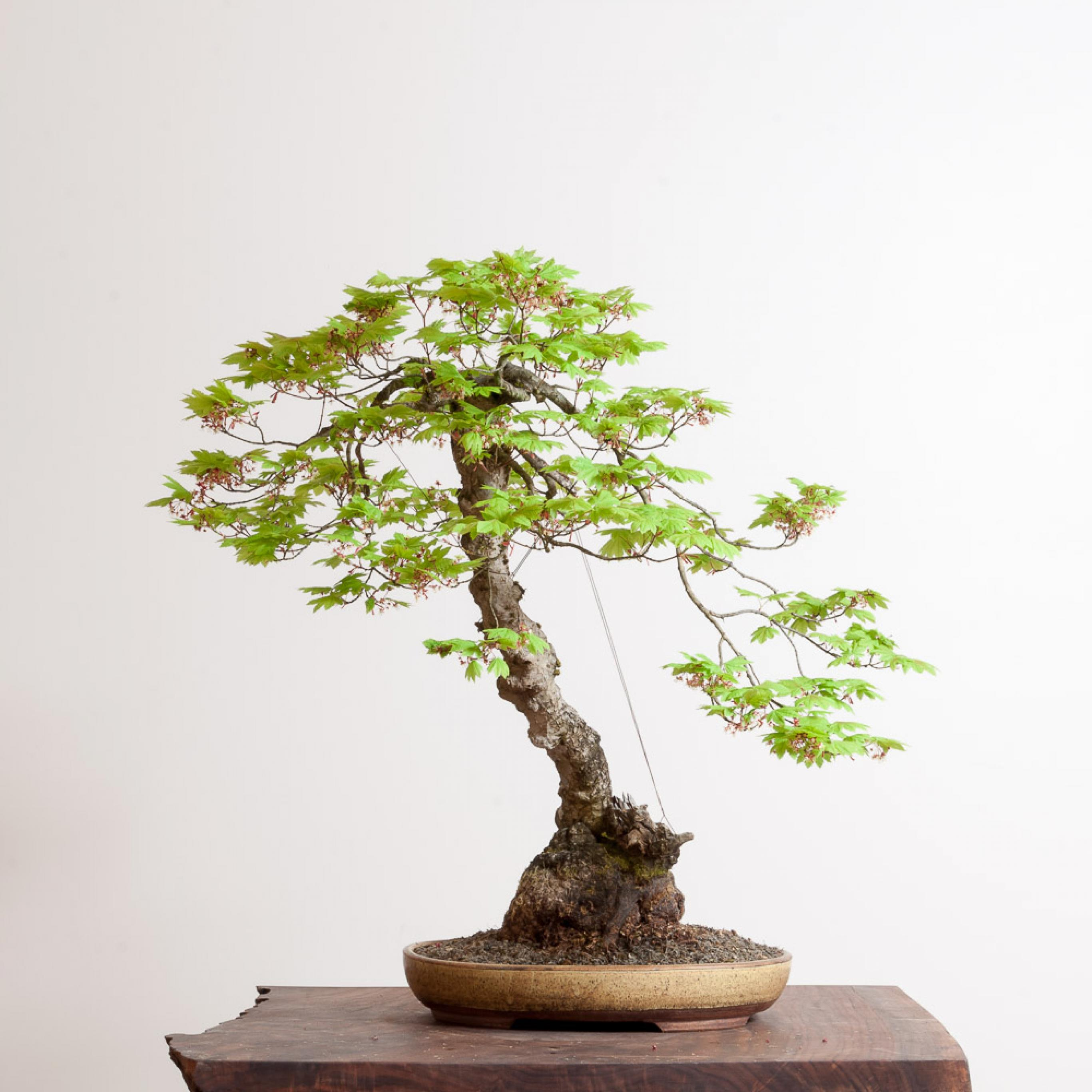
Vine Maple bonsai

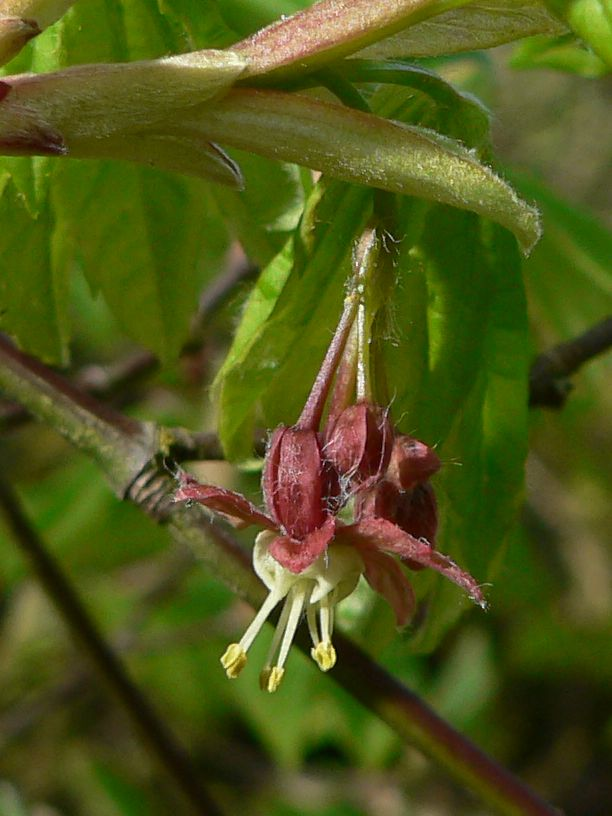
Flower with reddish calyx and five short petals

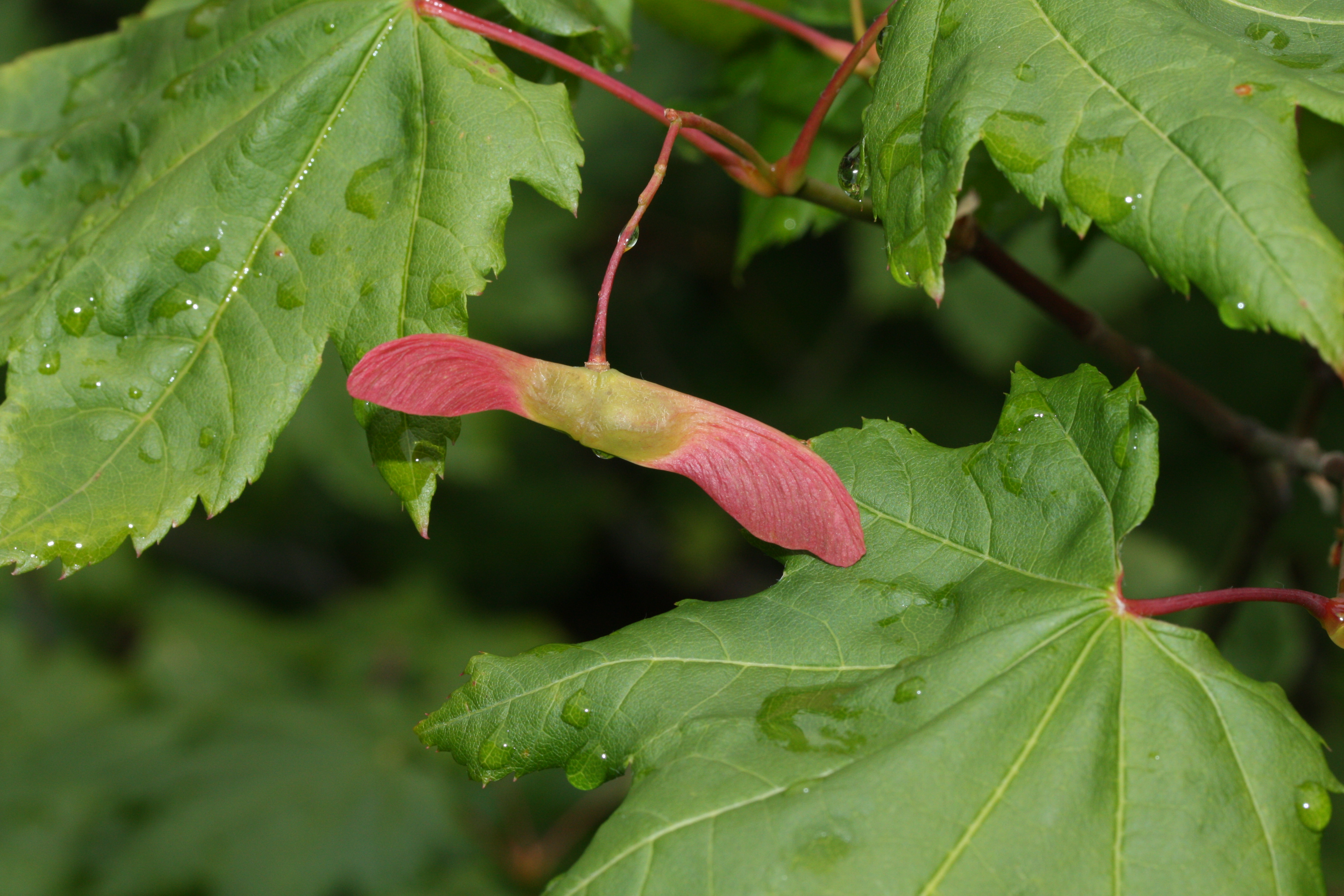
The fruit is borne in pairs. With wings nearly 180 degrees apart, it is initially green, later becoming reddish (shown) to brown.

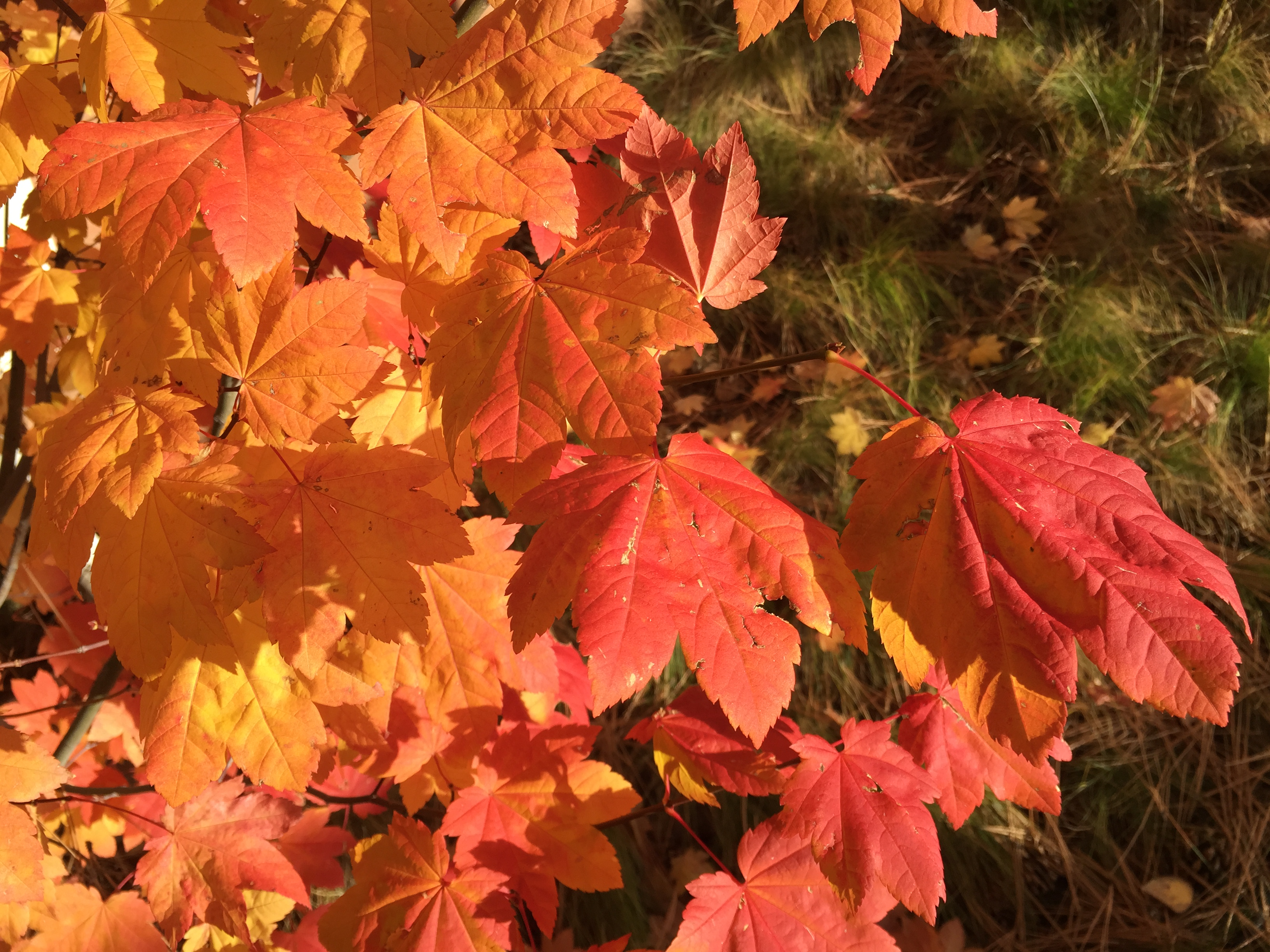
Autumn foliage of Acer circinatum
