= Colchuck Balanced Rock =

Mountain summit in Washington, US

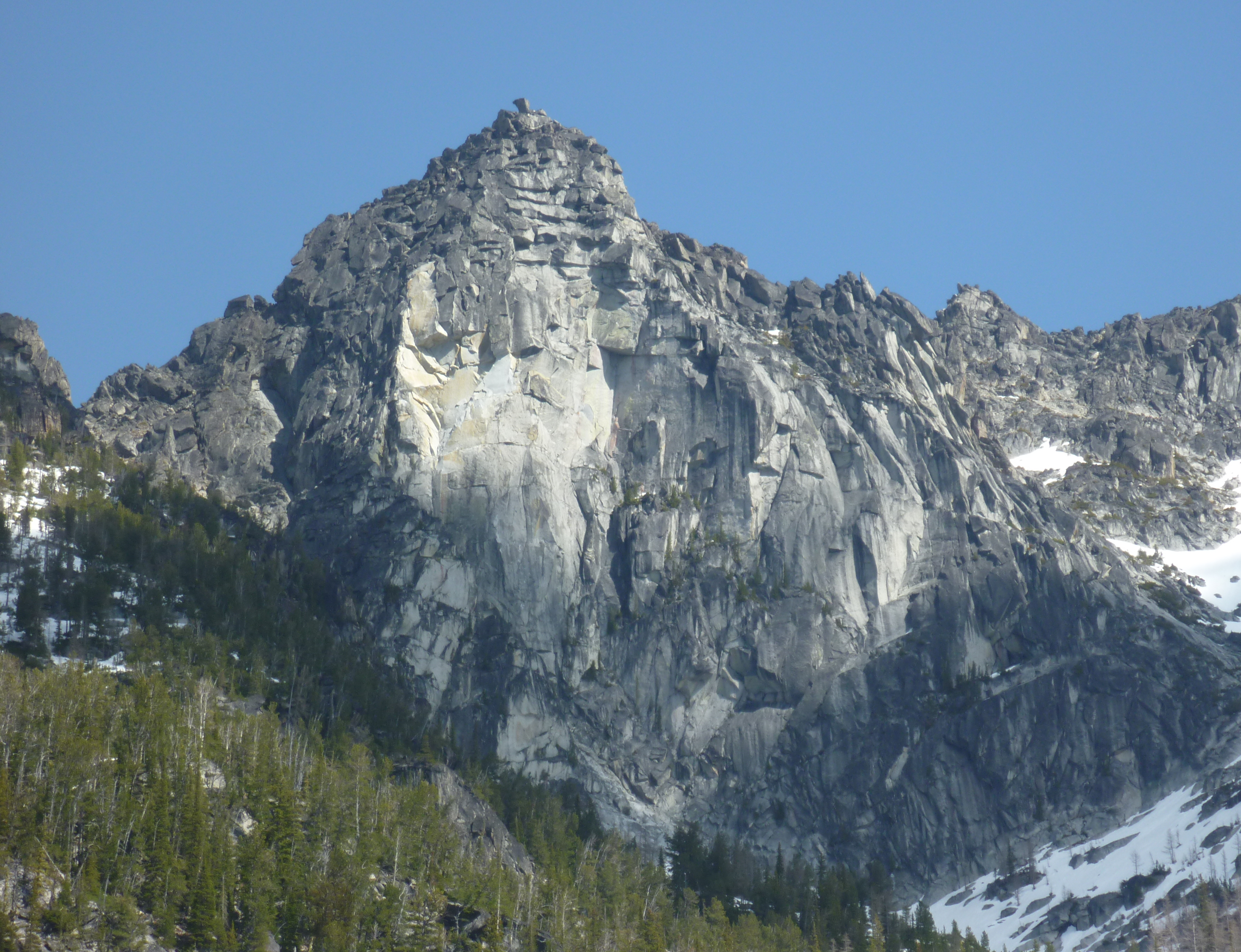
- Colchuck Balanced Rock from Colchuck Lake Trail

Highest point
- Elevation: 8,240 ft (2,512 m)
- Prominence: 229 ft (70 m)
- Parent peak: Enchantment Peak (8,543 ft)
- Coordinates: 47°29′29″N 120°49′08″W

Geography
- Location within Washington (state) Location within the United States
- Country: United States
- State: Washington
- County: Chelan
- Protected area: Alpine Lakes Wilderness
- Parent range: Stuart Range; Cascade Range
- Topo map: USGS Enchantment Lakes

Geology
- Rock type: Granite

Climbing
- First ascent: 1958 by Gene Prater, Thomas Quin
- Easiest route: Climbing

Colchuck Balanced Rock is an 8,240-foot (2,512-metre) granite mountain summit located in Chelan County of Washington state. Colchuck Balanced Rock is part of The Enchantments within the Alpine Lakes Wilderness. It belongs to the Stuart Range which is subset of the Cascade Range. Colchuck Balanced Rock is situated west of Enchantment Peak, and east of Jabberwocky Tower and Colchuck Lake. Precipitation runoff from the peak drains into the lake and Mountaineer Creek, a tributary of Icicle Creek. The climbing approach is via the Colchuck Lake Trail, then traversing away from Aasgard Pass approximately 400 feet above the lake. The mountain is named for its pyramidal summit which has a top-block that nests, rather than balances, on the summit. The mountain and glacier take their name from the lake, which in Chinook Jargon means "cold water" or "ice".

== Climate ==
Weather fronts coming off the Pacific Ocean travel east toward the Cascade Mountains. As fronts approach, they are forced upward by the peaks of the Cascade Range, causing them to drop their moisture in the form of rain or snowfall onto the Cascades (Orographic lift). As a result, the Cascades experience high precipitation, especially during the winter months in the form of snowfall. During winter months, weather is usually cloudy, but, due to high pressure systems over the Pacific Ocean that intensify during summer months, there is often little or no cloud cover during the summer.

== Geology ==
The Alpine Lakes Wilderness features some of the most rugged topography in the Cascade Range with craggy peaks and ridges, deep glacial valleys, and granite spires spotted with over 700 mountain lakes. Geological events occurring many years ago created the diverse topography and drastic elevation changes over the Cascade Range leading to various climate differences.

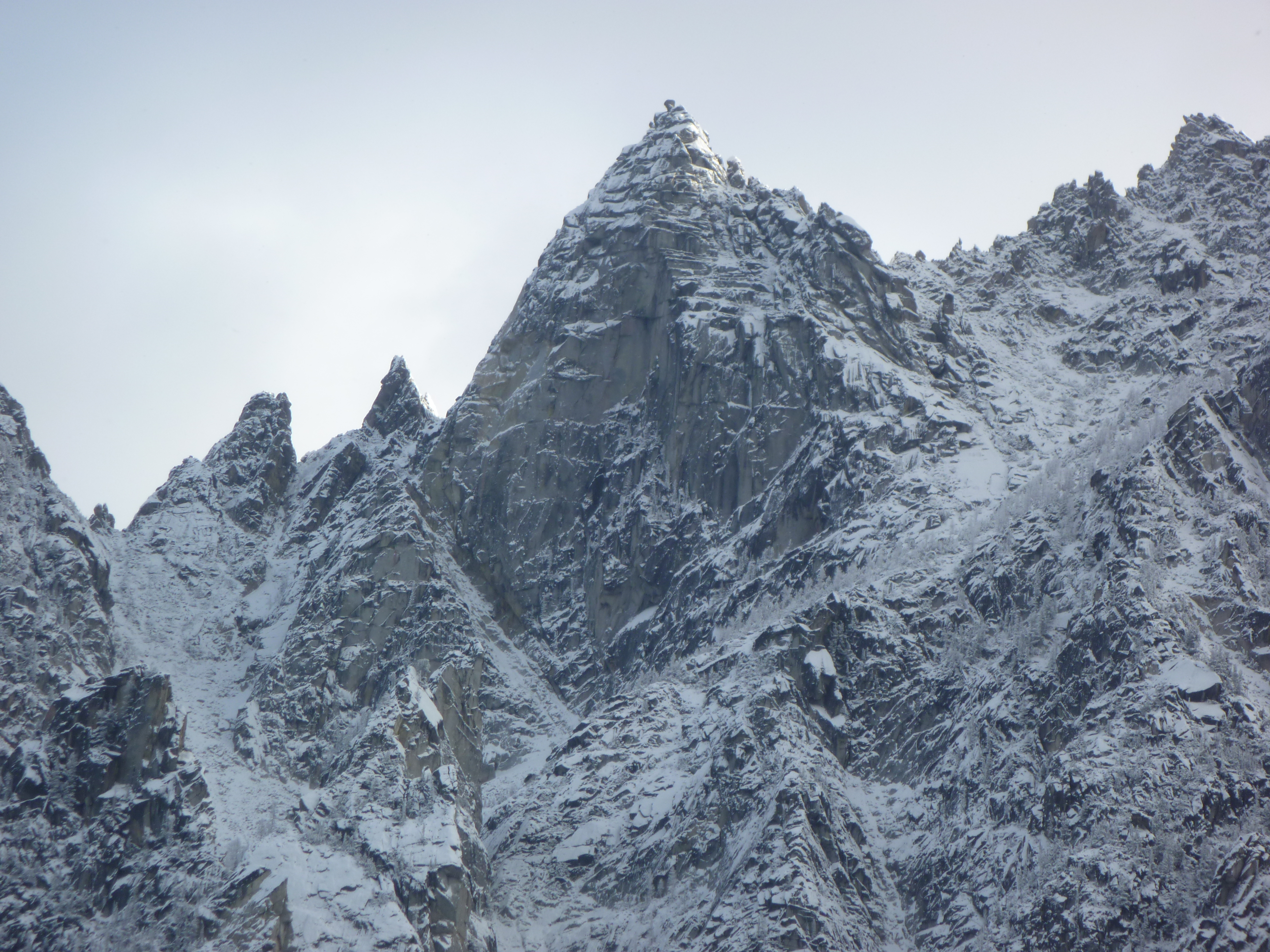
Colchuck Balanced Rock

The history of the formation of the Cascade Mountains dates back millions of years ago to the late Eocene Epoch. With the North American Plate overriding the Pacific Plate, episodes of volcanic igneous activity persisted. In addition, small fragments of the oceanic and continental lithosphere called terranes created the North Cascades about 50 million years ago.

During the Pleistocene period dating back over two million years ago, glaciation advancing and retreating repeatedly scoured the landscape leaving deposits of rock debris. The last glacial retreat in the Alpine Lakes area began about 14,000 years ago and was north of the Canada–US border by 10,000 years ago. The U-shaped cross section of the river valleys is a result of that recent glaciation. Uplift and faulting in combination with glaciation have been the dominant processes which have created the tall peaks and deep valleys of the Alpine Lakes Wilderness area.

== Climbing Routes ==
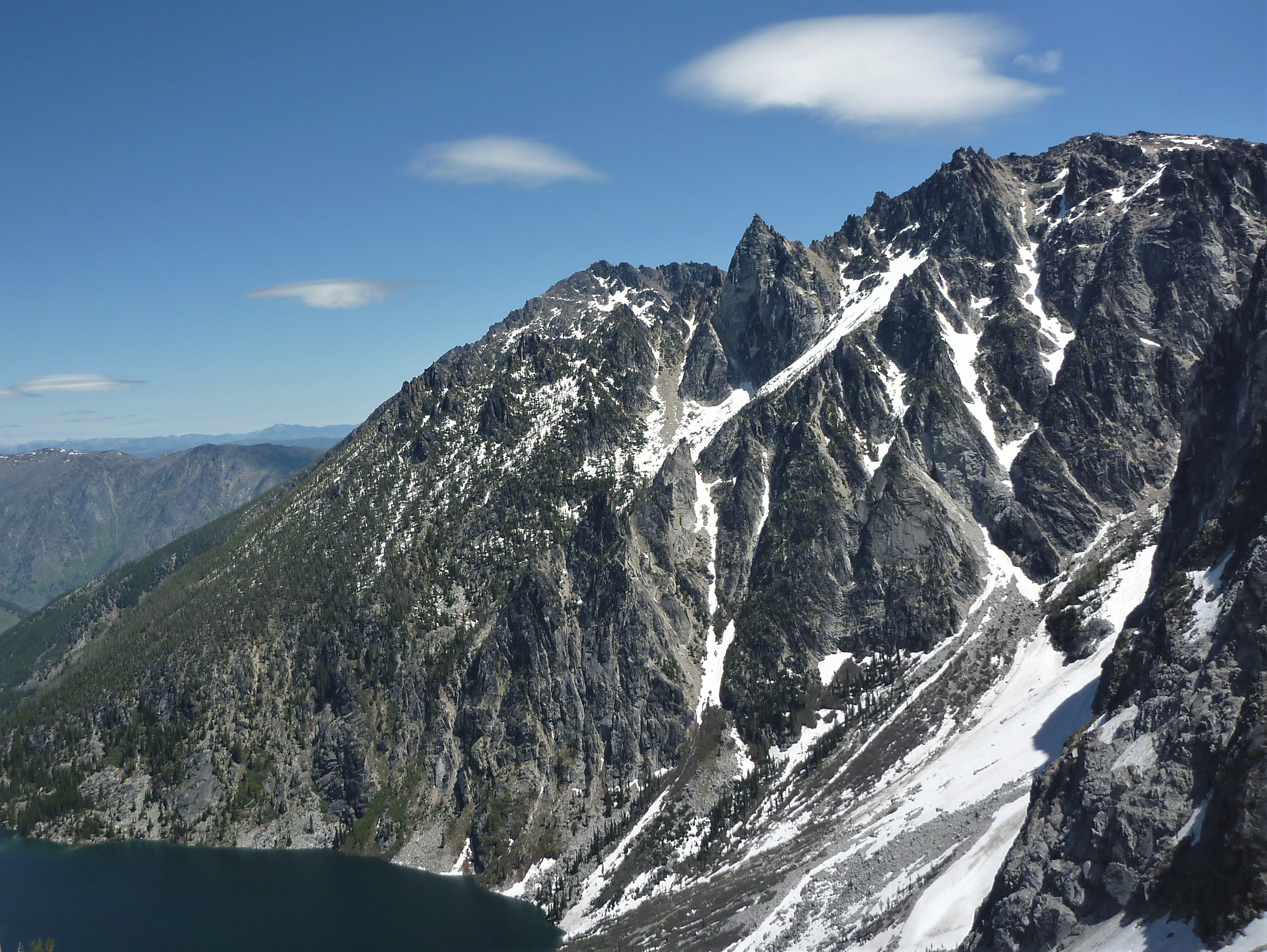
Colchuck Balanced Rock above Colchuck Lake

Climbing Routes on Colchuck Balanced Rock

- Colchuck Balanced Rock Col - class 3
- The Tipping Point - class 5.12 8 pitches
- Let it Burn - class 5.12- 8 pitches
- West Face - class 5.11+ 9 pitches
- The Tempest - class 5.12+ 6 pitches
- Full Tilt (Tempest Wall Free Version) - class 5.12 5 pitches
- The Scoop - class 5.11c 10 pitches
- Rikki Tikki Tavi - class 5.11 5 pitches
- Leche La Vaca - class 5.10 4 pitches
