= Snow Lakes =

System of freshwater lakes in Chelan County, Washington

Snow Lake
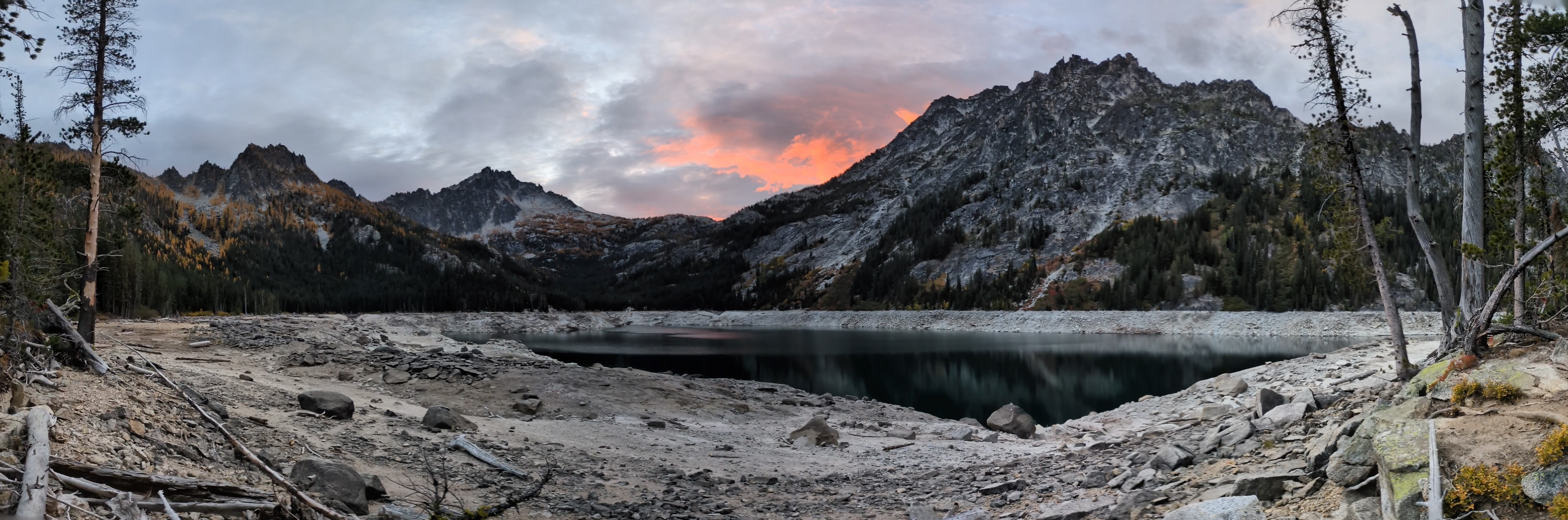
- Upper Snow Lake at sunset (11 October 2024)

- Location within Washington (state) Location within the United States
- Location: Chelan County, Washington, United States
- Coordinates: 47.483116°N 120.7586572°W
- Primary outflows: Snow Creek
- Basin countries: United States
- Surface area: 189.3 acres (76.6 ha)
- Surface elevation: 5,433 ft (1,656 m)

Snow Lakes are a system of freshwater reservoir lakes made by Upper Snow Lake and Lower Snow Lake, approximately a mile long. They are located on the eastern slope of The Enchantments, in Chelan County, Washington. The Snow Lakes are one of the most heavily used destination in the Forest Service wildernesses in Oregon and Washington. Self-issued Alpine Lakes Wilderness permits are required for transit within the Snow Lakes area.

== History ==
Archaeological surveying in the area of the Snow Lakes shows evidence that the occupation of indigenous groups dated to at least 12,000 years before the present era. The lakes are within the traditional territory of the Wenatchi People, one of the Confederated Tribes of the Colville Reservation and within the ceded lands of the Yakama Nation.

Euro-Americans arrived in the 1800s, primarily fur trappers. The Wenatchi people were relocated following the Treaty of 1855 to the Yakama and Colville Reservations while the local population became comprised then of Chinese immigrant prospecting as gold miners and Euro-American settlers working in the timber and agriculture industries. Urban Grassi, a Catholic priest was the first to use irrigation in the Valley.

The Icicle Irrigation District applied in 1930 for the right to appropriate water from the Snow Lakes for seasonal irrigation purposes. The State Supervisor of Hydraulics had issued Permit Number 828 in January 1927 for the appropriation of surrounding lakes. The irrigation district also sought permission to raise the lake levels because of inadequate summer flows for irrigation. The Department of Public Lands approved this request in an order that allowed the irrigation district to inundate lakeshores on the lake. The dams on Upper and Lower Snow Lakes as well as neighboring Nada Lake were completed in 1940 and later expanded in 1941 by the United States Bureau of Reclamation authorizing 25 cfs, 1,000 acre-feet per year for irrigation of 7,000 acres of lands. The Snow Lakes also have water right certificate for 16,000 acre-feet per year to supplement the water supply for the Leavenworth National Fish Hatchery and holding ponds.

The Snow Lakes system is owned and operated by United States Fish and Wildlife Service. In 1939, the Bureau of Reclamation acquired an easement on portions adjacent to Snow and Nada Lakes from the IPID. That easement was transferred to the U.S. Forest Service in 1949 which owns lands adjacent to the shoreline of Upper and Lower Snow Lakes, approximately 1,084 acres including the Upper Snow, Lower Snow, and Nada Lakes.

The Icicle Irrigation District has existing water rights, easements, and access agreements with the United States Forest Service that allow the lakes to be used for storage and release of water. These agreements include the right to conduct maintenance activities within the areas of the lake.

== Dams ==
=== Upper Snow Lake ===
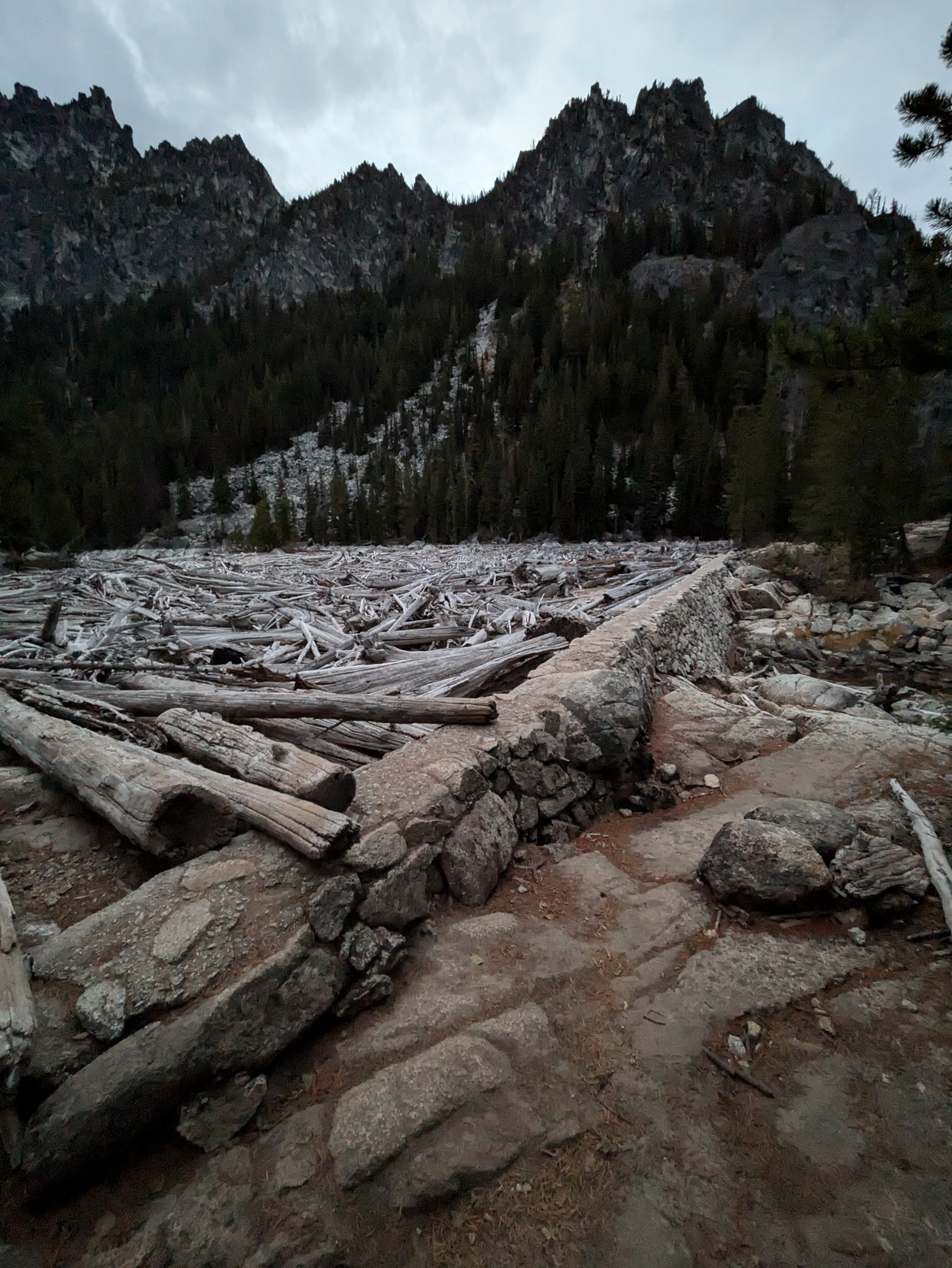
Upper Snow Lake dam at dusk (11 October 2024)

Upper Snow Lake is contained by a masonry dam constructed in the late 1930s out of cement and locally derived rock and located at the natural outlet towards Lower Snow Lake. The crest elevation is 5,428 feet. The dam functions as an overflow spillway for the Lake with a maximum height of approximately 10 feet and a crest length of 119 feet.

Water outflows from the Upper Snow Lake to Nada Lake through a 36-inch penstock. Operation of flow through the penstock is controlled by 3 valves. The valve furthest upstream is a 30-inch gate valve, which is primarily used to cut off flow when not in use. The second is an 8-inch valve that provides a bypass around the gate valve to equalize pressure prior to the operation of the gate valve. The third valve is a 20-inch butterfly valve located at the end of the penstock and is used for throttling to control the flow from Upper Snow Lake to Nada Lake.

=== Lower Snow Lake ===
Lower Snow Lake is contained by a masonry dam constructed in the late 1930s out of cement and locally derived rock and located at the natural outlet of the lake into Snow Creek. The crest elevation is 5,423 feet. The dam functions as an overflow spillway for the Lake with a maximum height of approximately 6 feet and a crest length of 112 feet. The dam has a 42-foot long overflow section with a 2-foot wing dike extending to right abutment.

== Hydrology ==
Upper Snow Lake drains water through its valve from July to October flowing down a steep boulder field into Nada Lake, and then water is released from Nada Lake down Snow Creek a tributary of Icicle Creek. If water levels are high in Upper Snow Lake, water will flow over the top of the small dam and into Lower Snow Lake.

When Upper Snow Lake drains at the end of the summer, the water level is lower than in Lower Snow Lake so water flows up into Upper Snow Lake through a 9-square-foot hole with a flapper gate at the base of the Upper Snow Lake Dam. In 2005, it was estimated that approximately 200 acre-feet of water passed through the opening.

== Uses ==
Snow Lake is managed by the Icicle and Peshastin Irrigation Districts (IPID) to provide water storage for irrigation and fish propagation. The lake captures water runoff at the far southeast of the 136,916-acre Icicle Creek drainage basin which gives the lake a high potential for refill, even during dry years. The reservoir is contained by a dam consisting of a rock and masonry structure with an embankment section that extends into a tunnel 7 x 9 feet cut into solid granite, reaching 2,250 feet long that works as an outlet and a valve gate to regulate flow out of the lake. This infrastructure allows for controlled releases of stored water to supplement flows into Icicle Creek through its outflowing tributaries and increase the water supply available during low flow periods, which typically occur during the late summer. Between 1994 and 2005, the total average usable storage volume from Snow Lakes is 8,600 acre-feet. Due to the reliability of recharge in the Upper and Lower Snow Lakes basin the storage volume isn't always persistent, however between the Alpine Lakes managed by the IPID the usable storage volume is approximately 20,015 acre-feet.

The Leavenworth National Fish Hatchery receives Water supply from a combination of Icicle Creek flows and groundwater wells with reservoir storage from Snow Lakes and Nada Lake. The hatchery serves as mitigation for fish losses resulting from the construction of Grand Coulee Dam and the creation of the Columbia Basin Project. The year-round water supply to the hatchery ensures current production goals of 1.2 million fish annually.

=== Recreation ===
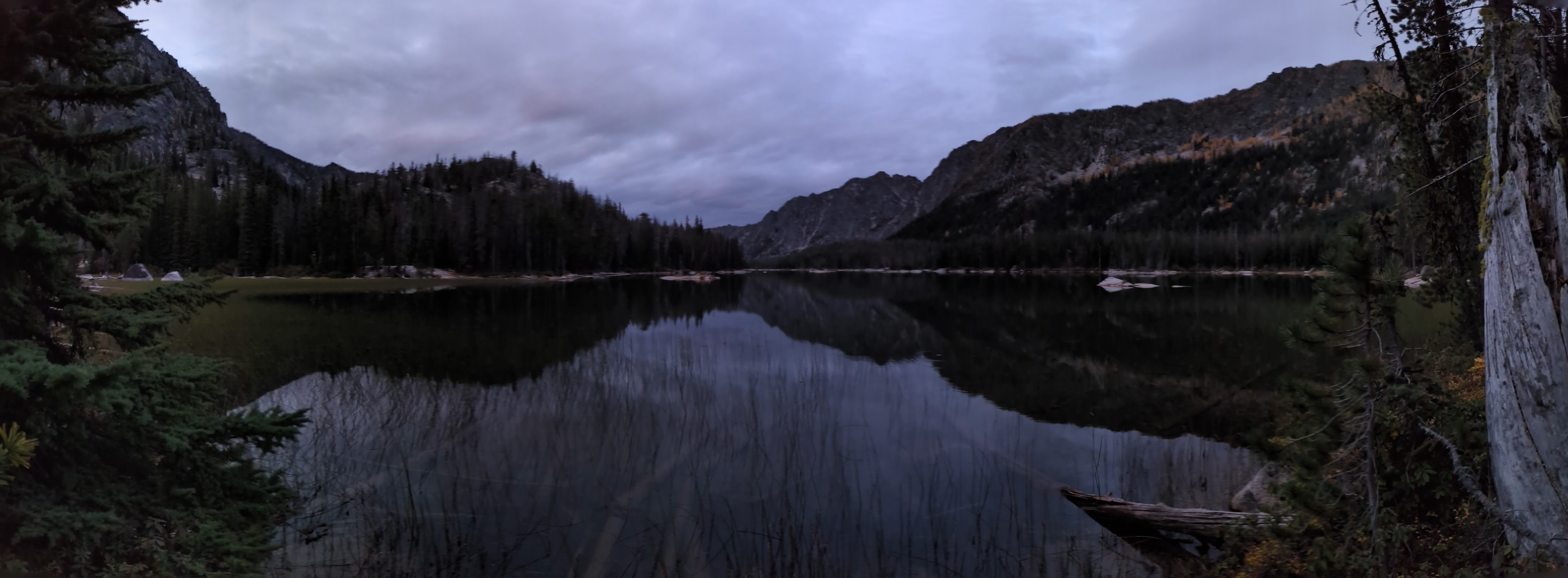
Lower Snow Lake after sunset (11 October 2024)

Most visitors to Snow Lakes are day hikers although the lakes are provided with campsites. The majority of visitors remain in the Southeast shore where the trail system approaches Upper Snow Lake. Areas on the north shore are equipped with campsites although not as frequently trafficked as the beginning of the trail system. Most visitors that are found on the trail that parallels the lake shoreline tend to be climbers to lakes further past Upper Snow Lake.

== Access ==
The foot trail starts at the trailhead off Icicle Creek Road (USFS Road 7600) 5 miles southwest of Leavenworth. The trail crosses over Icicle Creek by a bridge and starts the climb up the Alpine rock canyon. The trail will lead first to Nada Lake, approximately 5.5 miles from the trailhead. The trail has a second lap towards the Snow Lakes that starts on the Southeast shore of Nada Lake. Lower Snow Lake is 1.75 miles, Lake Viviane is another mile through an unmaintained trail, then Leprechaun Lake a short climb past Lake Viviane. Further up the trail leads to Sprite Pond and around the east side of Perfection Lake where the trail then becomes Colchuck Lake Trail #1599.1.

Self-issued Alpine Lake Wilderness permit is required for transit within the Snow Lakes area.

== See also ==
- List of lakes of the Alpine Lakes Wilderness
