= Jabberwocky Tower =

Granite spire in Washington, United States

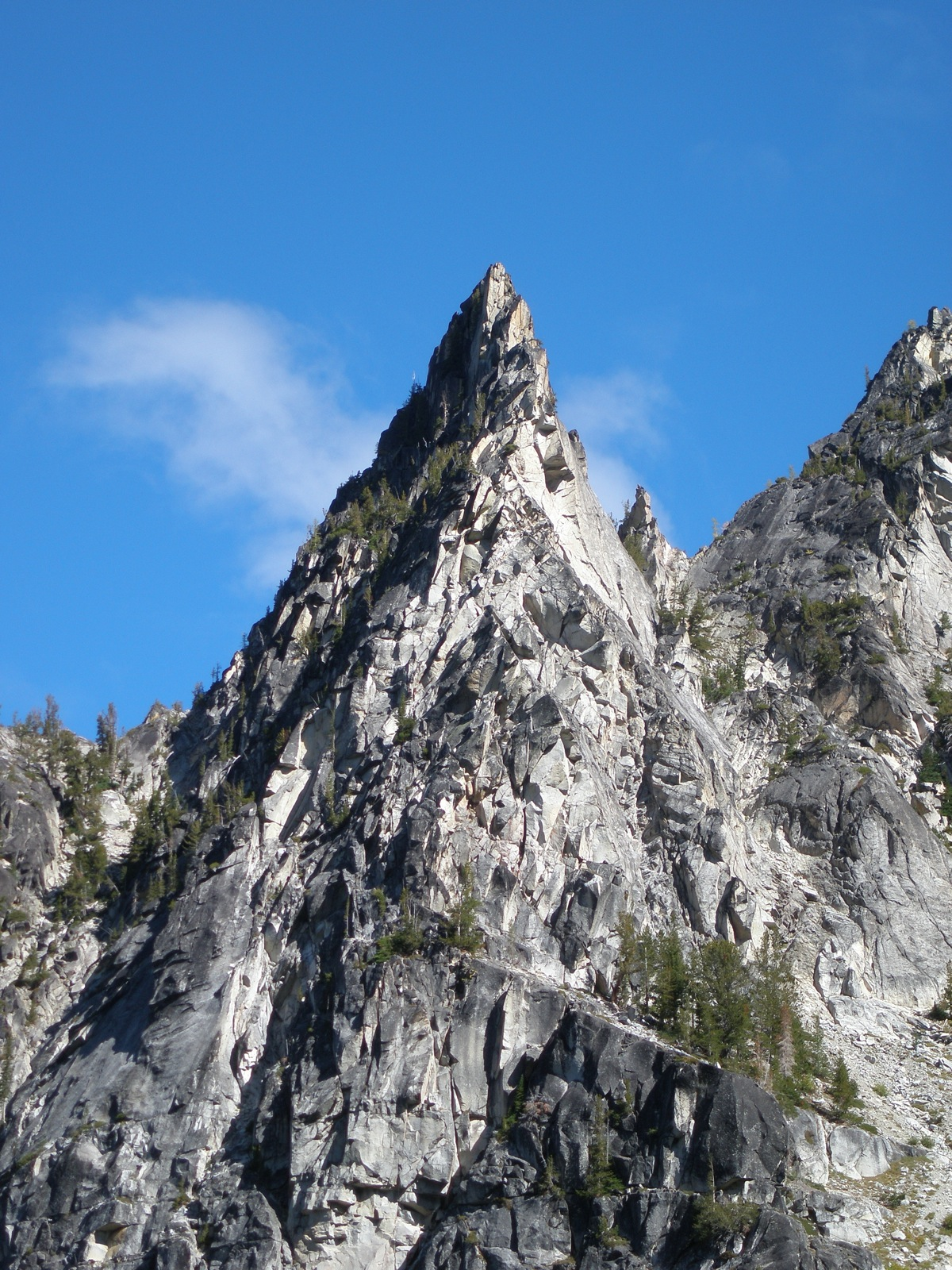
- Jabberwocky Tower

Highest point
- Elevation: 6,840 ft (2,080 m)
- Prominence: 40 ft (12 m)
- Parent peak: Colchuck Balanced Rock 8200+ ft
- Coordinates: 47°29′28″N 120°49′34″W

Geography
- Location within Washington (state) Location within the United States
- Country: United States
- State: Washington
- County: Chelan
- Protected area: Alpine Lakes Wilderness
- Parent range: Cascade Range
- Topo map: USGS Enchantment Lakes

Geology
- Rock type: Granite

Climbing
- First ascent: July 13, 1970 by Dave Beckstead and Paul Myhre
- Easiest route: Climbing class 5.6

Jabberwocky Tower is a 6,840-foot-elevation granite spire located in Chelan County of Washington state. Jabberwocky Tower is part of The Enchantments within the Alpine Lakes Wilderness. It belongs to the Stuart Range which is subset of the Cascade Range. Jabberwocky Tower is situated east of Colchuck Lake and west of Enchantment Peak. Precipitation runoff drains into Icicle Creek, a tributary of the Wenatchee River.

== Climate ==
Most weather fronts originate in the Pacific Ocean, and travel east toward the Cascade Mountains. As fronts approach, they are forced upward by the peaks of the Cascade Range, causing them to drop their moisture in the form of rain or snowfall onto the Cascades (Orographic lift). As a result, the Cascades experience high precipitation, especially during the winter months in the form of snowfall. During winter months, weather is usually cloudy, but, due to high pressure systems over the Pacific Ocean that intensify during summer months, there is often little or no cloud cover during the summer. Because of maritime influence, snow tends to be wet and heavy, resulting in high avalanche danger.

== Geology ==
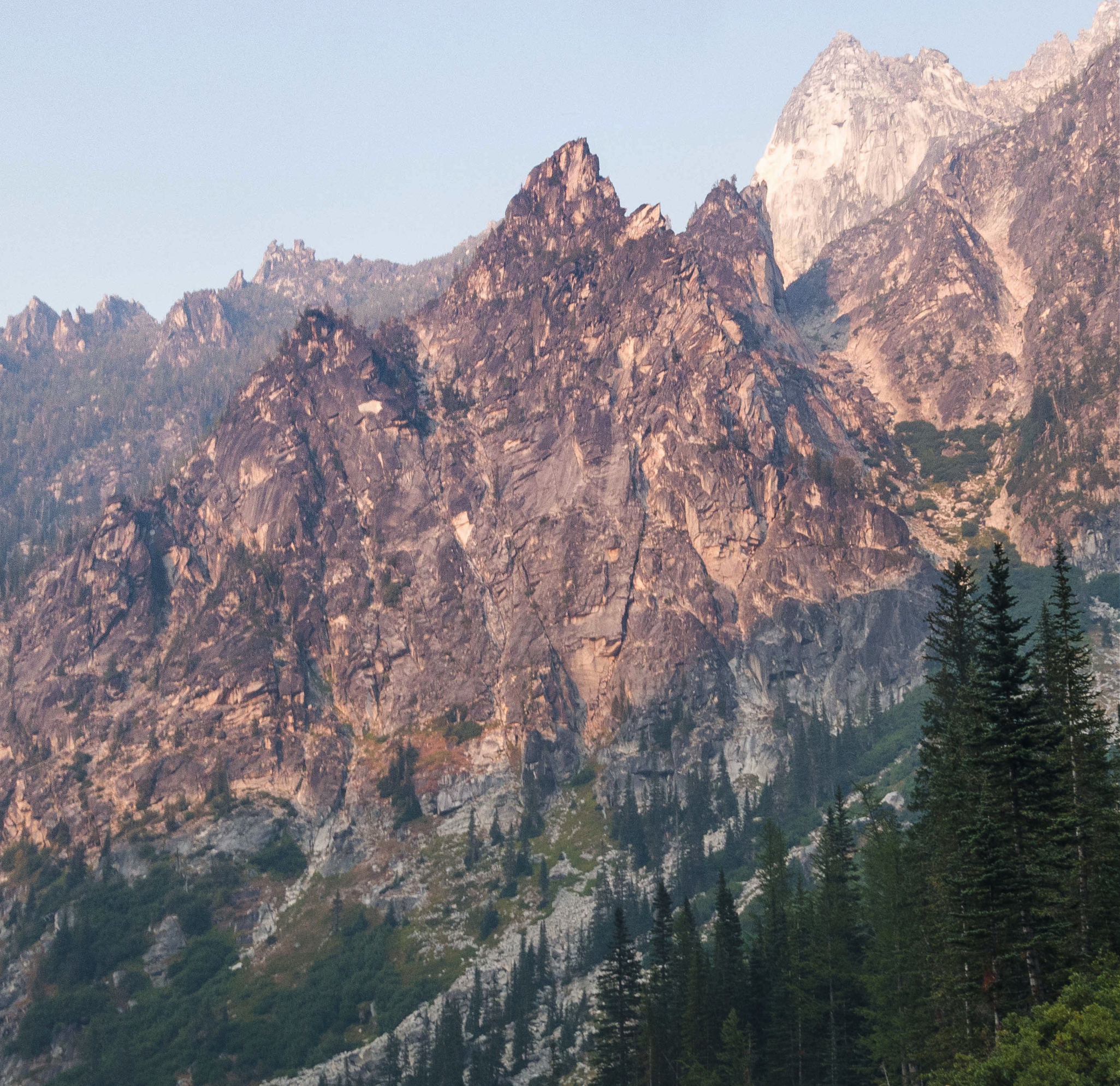
Jabberwocky Tower

The Alpine Lakes Wilderness features some of the most rugged topography in the Cascade Range with craggy peaks and ridges, deep glacial valleys, and granite spires spotted with over 700 mountain lakes. Geological events occurring many years ago created the diverse topography and drastic elevation changes over the Cascade Range leading to the various climate differences.

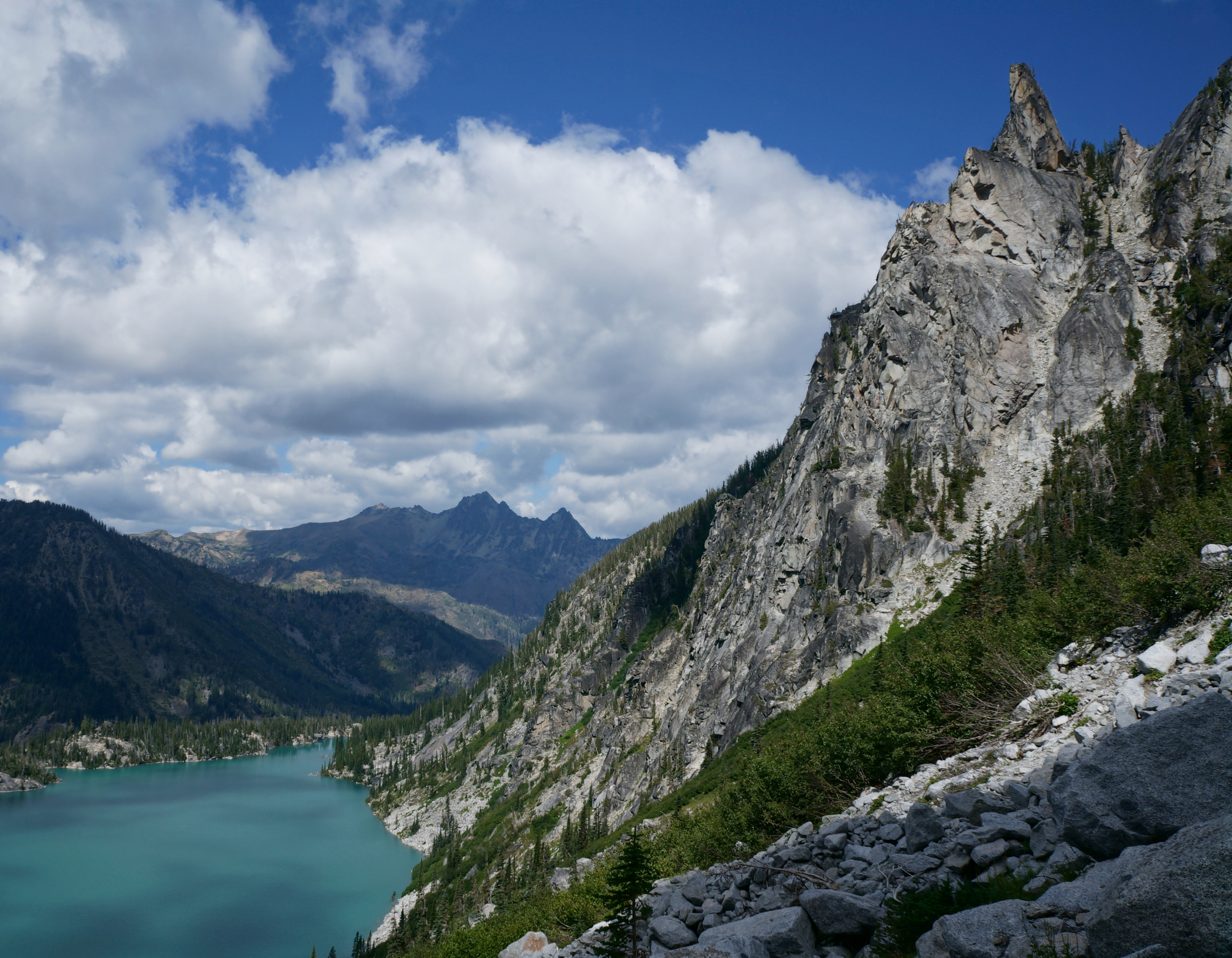
Colchuck Lake, Jabberwocky Tower

The history of the formation of the Cascade Mountains dates back millions of years ago to the late Eocene Epoch. With the North American Plate overriding the Pacific Plate, episodes of volcanic igneous activity persisted. In addition, small fragments of the oceanic and continental lithosphere called terranes created the North Cascades about 50 million years ago.

During the Pleistocene period dating back over two million years ago, glaciation advancing and retreating repeatedly scoured the landscape leaving deposits of rock debris. The last glacial retreat in the Alpine Lakes area began about 14,000 years ago and was north of the Canada–US border by 10,000 years ago. The U-shaped cross section of the river valleys is a result of that recent glaciation. Uplift and faulting in combination with glaciation have been the dominant processes which have created the tall peaks and deep valleys of the Alpine Lakes Wilderness area.
