= Nada Lake =

Lake in Washington, United States

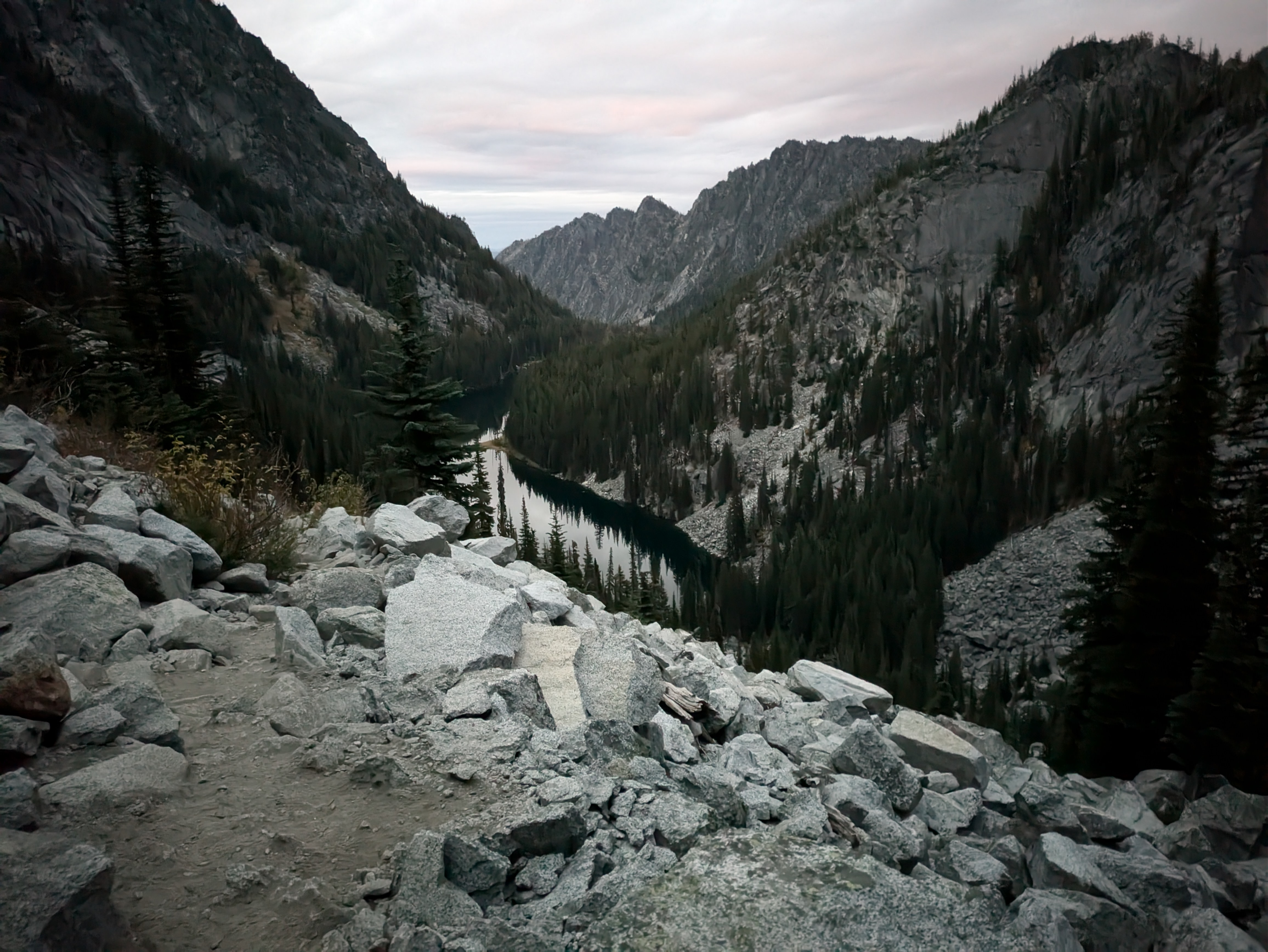
- Photo taken after dark with night vision mode (11 October 2024)

- Location within Washington (state) Location within the United States
- Location: Chelan County, Washington, United States
- Coordinates: 47.4960919°N 120.7387930°W
- Primary outflows: Snow Creek
- Basin countries: United States
- Surface elevation: 4,898 ft (1,493 m)

Nada Lake is a freshwater reservoir lake located on the eastern slope of The Enchantments, in Chelan County, Washington. Self-issued Alpine Lakes Wilderness permits are required for transit within the Snow Lakes area.

== History ==
Archaeological surveying of the area surrounding Nada Lake shows evidence that it was occupied by indigenous groups by at least 12,000 B.C.E.. The lakes are within the traditional territory of the Wenatchi People, one of the Confederated Tribes of the Colville Reservation and within the ceded lands of the Yakama Nation.

Euro-Americans arrived in the 1800s, primarily fur trappers. The Wenatchi people were relocated, following the Treaty of 1855, to the Yakama and Colville Reservations while the local population became comprised then of Chinese immigrant prospecting as gold miners and Euro-American settlers working in the timber and agriculture industries. Urban Grassi, a Catholic Priest was the first to use irrigation in the Valley.

The Icicle Irrigation District applied in 1930 for the right to appropriate water from the Snow Lakes for seasonal irrigation purposes. The State Supervisor of Hydraulics had issued Permit Number 828 in January 1927 for the appropriation of surrounding lakes. The irrigation district also sought permission to raise the lake levels because of inadequate summer flows for irrigation. The Department of Public Lands approved this request in an order that allowed the irrigation district to inundate lakeshores on the lake. The dam on Nada Lake as well as neighboring Upper and Lower Snow Lakes were completed in 1940 and later expanded in 1941 by the United States Bureau of Reclamation authorizing 25 cfs, 1,000 acre-feet per year for irrigation of 7,000 acres of lands. Nada Lake also supplies water for the Leavenworth National Fish Hatchery and holding ponds.

Nada Lake and the Snow Lakes system are owned and operated by United States Fish and Wildlife Service. In 1939, the Bureau of Reclamation acquired an easement on portions adjacent to Snow and Nada Lakes from the IPID. That easement was transferred to the U.S. Forest Service in 1949 which owns lands adjacent to the shoreline of Upper and Lower Snow Lakes, approximately 1,084 acres including the Upper Snow, Lower Snow, and Nada Lakes.

== Hydrology ==
Upper Snow Lake drains water through its valve from July to October flowing down a steep boulder field into Nada Lake, and then water is released from Nada Lake down Snow Creek a tributary of Icicle Creek. If water levels are high in Upper Snow Lake, water will flow over the top of the small dam and into Lower Snow Lake.

== Uses ==
Nada Lake is managed by the Icicle and Peshastin Irrigation Districts (IPID) to provide water storage for irrigation and fish propagation. The lake captures water runoff at the far southeast of the 136,916-acre Icicle Creek drainage basin which gives the lake a high potential for refill, even during dry years. The reservoir is contained by a small dam consisting of a rock and masonry structure with stop logs and an earthen embankment section that extends from the rock-masonry/concrete structure to the hillside north of the dam. This infrastructure allows for controlled releases of stored water to supplement flows into Icicle Creek through its outflowing tributaries and increase the water supply available during low flow periods, which typically occur during the late summer. Between 1994 and 2005, the total average usable storage volume from Snow Lakes is 8,600 acre-feet. Due to the reliability of recharge in the Upper and Lower Snow Lakes basin the storage volume isn't always persistent, however between the Alpine Lakes managed by the IPID the usable storage volume is approximately 20,015 acre-feet.

The Leavenworth National Fish Hatchery receives water supply from a combination of Icicle Creek flows and groundwater wells with approximately 50 cfs of reservoir storage from Snow Lakes and Nada Lake. The hatchery serves as mitigation for fish losses resulting from the construction of Grand Coulee Dam and the creation of the Columbia Basin Project. The year-round water supply to the hatchery ensures current production goals of 1.2 million fish annually.

== Access ==
The foot trail starts at the trailhead off Icicle Creek Road (USFS Road 7600) 5 miles southwest of Leavenworth. The trail crosses over Icicle Creek by a bridge and starts the climb up the Alpine rock canyon. The trail will lead first to Nada Lake, approximately 5.5 miles from the trailhead. The trail has a second lap towards the Snow Lakes that starts on the Southeast shore of Nada Lake. Self-issued Alpine Lake Wilderness permit is required for transit within the Snow Lakes area.

== See also ==
- List of lakes of the Alpine Lakes Wilderness
