= Aasgard Pass =

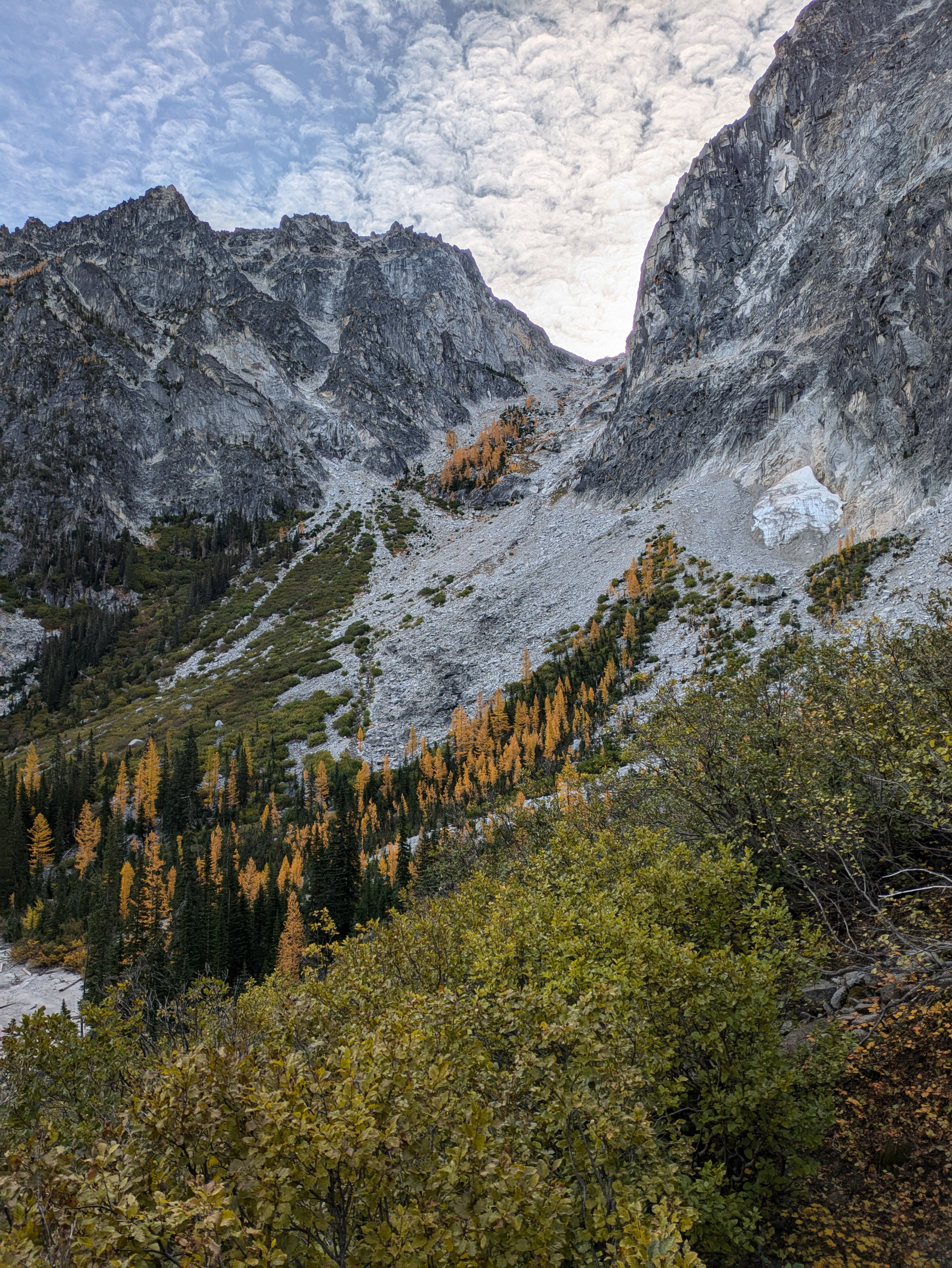
- Aasgard Pass, viewed from near the shore of Colchuck Lake (October 2024)
- Interactive map of Aasgard Pass
- Elevation: 7,841 feet (2,390 m)
- Traversed by: Unmaintained United States Forest Service foot trail

Third Approach
- Location: Chelan County, Washington, US
- Range: Stuart Range, in the Cascades
- Coordinates: 47°28′49″N 120°49′14″W

Aasgard Pass, officially identified as Colchuck Pass, (elevation 7,841 feet (2,390 m)) is a mountain pass on the east side of the Cascades in Washington's Alpine Lakes Wilderness southwest of Leavenworth. It is the shorter and steeper of two primary hiking routes into the Enchantments, one of Washington's most popular hiking areas. It separates Colchuck Lake (elevation 5,570 feet (1,700 m)) to the northwest from the Upper Enchantment Basin (elevation ~7,500 feet (2,300 m)) to the southeast. Aasgard Pass is located at the saddle between Dragontail Peak and the Enchantment Peaks.
