= Leavenworth National Fish Hatchery =

- U.S. National Register of Historic Places
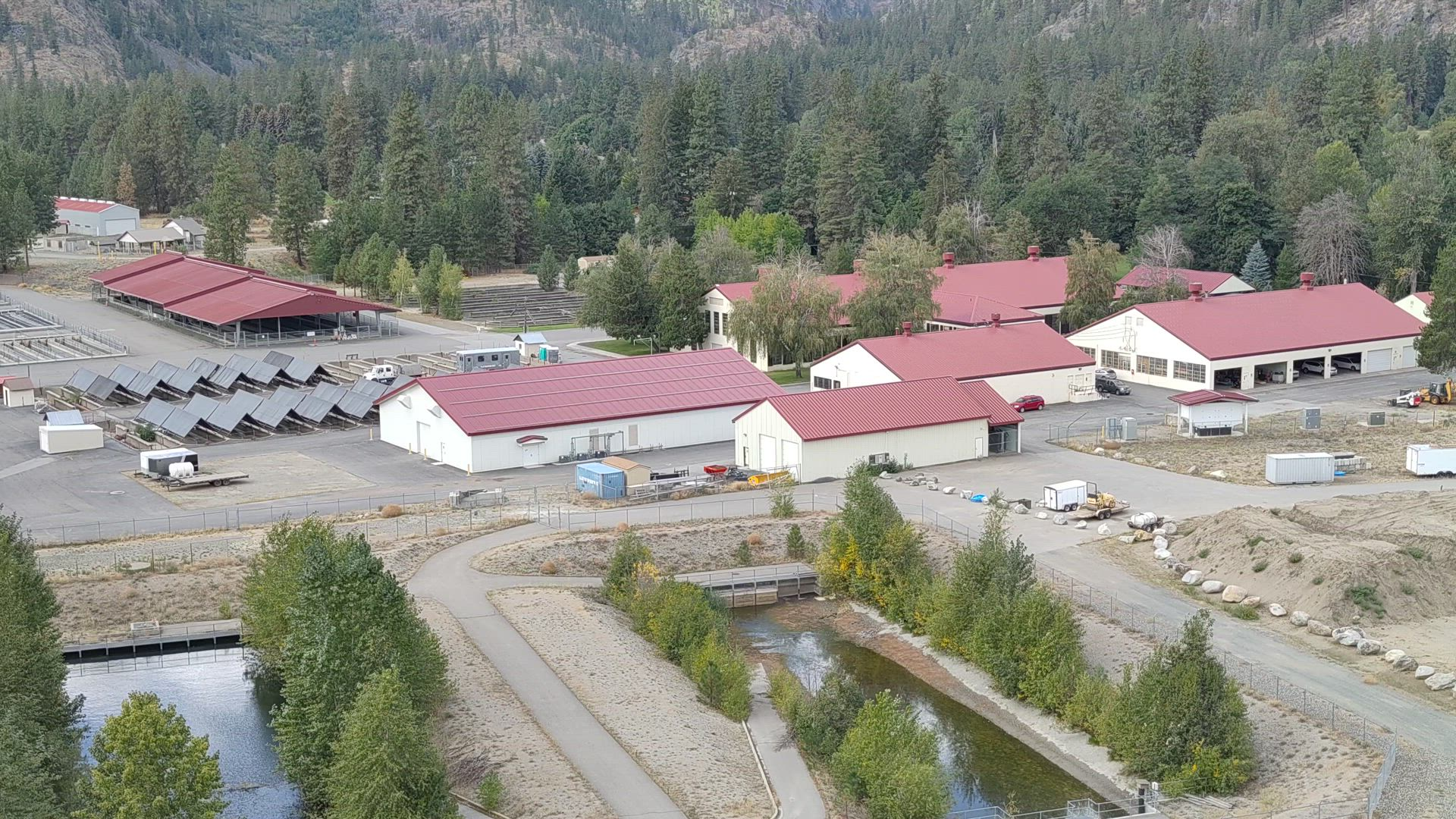

- Location within Washington (state) Location within the United States
- Location: Leavenworth, Washington
- Coordinates: 47°33′31″N 120°40′30″W
- Built: 1940
- Engineer: U.S. Bureau of Reclamation
- NRHP reference No.: 98000847
- Added to NRHP: June 12, 1998

Leavenworth National Fish Hatchery is a federal fish hatchery located near Leavenworth, in the Icicle Creek in the U.S. state of Washington. The hatchery is operated by the United States Fish and Wildlife Service as part of the National Fish Hatchery System.

== History ==
The Leavenworth National Fish Hatchery was authorized in 1937 to mitigate the loss of fish in the Columbia River system following the construction of the Grand Coulee Dam. The site was selected because Icicle Creek had a natural curve that could be used for spawning ponds, and because the surrounding terrace had enough space for large rearing ponds and hatchery buildings. Planning and surveys took place from 1936 to 1938, and the Bureau of Reclamation built the hatchery from 1939 to 1940. At the time of completion the LNFH was the largest fish hatchery in the world.

The Leavenworth National Hatchery was designed as part of a larger hatchery program that also included Entiat and Winthrop national fish hatcheries, which opened in 1941 and 1942. The main hatchery building at Leavenworth served as the administrative headquarters and laboratory for the complex. The Leavenworth National Fish Hatchery was added to the National Registry of Historic Places in 1998. Many of the hatchery's original buildings remain in use, and the site still resembles its 1940s layout.

== Operations ==
The hatchery primarily raises spring Chinook salmon for release into Icicle Creek and the Wenatchee River watershed. Approximately 1.2 million Chinook salmon are released each year. The fishery also partners with Yakama Nation Fisheries on their Wenatchee watershed coho salmon program.

== Facilities and public use ==
Leavenworth National Fish hatchery includes rearing ponds, fish ladders, incubation facilities, and administrative buildings, many of which date to the original 1940 construction period. The hatchery grounds also contain walking trails, educational exhibits, and a public boat launch.

== Controversies ==
In 2018, the Leavenworth National Fish Hatchery became the subject of litigation over wastewater discharges into Icicle Creek. A federal court ruled that the hatchery complex had violated the Clean Water Act by operating for decades without required pollution discharge permits. The lawsuit was brought by the Wild Fish Conservancy against the U.S. Fish and Wildlife Service Service and the Environmental Protection Agency.
