= The Enchantments =

Scenic mountains near Leavenworth, Washington, USA

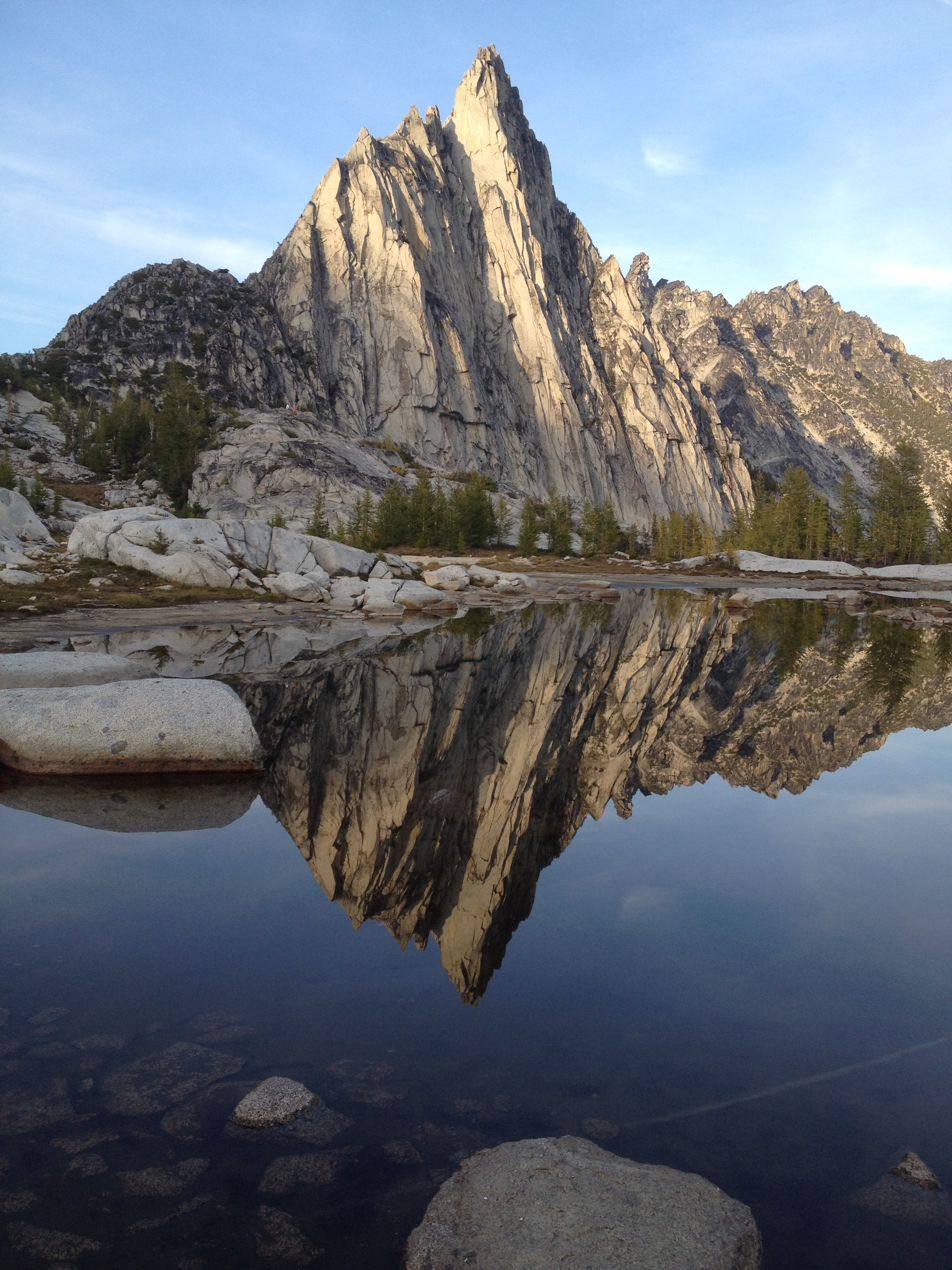
- View of Prusik Peak from Gnome Tarn

- Location within Washington (state)
- Floor elevation: 7,428 ft (2,264 m)
- Length: 5 mi (8.0 km)
- Depth: 1,400 ft (430 m)

Geography
- Country: United States
- State: Washington
- District: Alpine Lakes Wilderness
- Coordinates: 47°28′52″N 120°48′14″W
- Topo map: USGS Enchantment Lakes
- Interactive map of The Enchantments

The Enchantments is a region within the Alpine Lakes Wilderness area of Washington state's Cascade Mountain Range. At an elevation of 4,500 feet (1,372 m), it is home to over 700 alpine lakes and ponds surrounded by the vast peaks of Cashmere Crags, which rate among the best rock-climbing sites in the western United States. The highest peak, Dragontail Peak, stretches 8,840 feet (2,694 m) high. The Enchantments is located 15 miles southwest of the popular Bavarian-themed town Leavenworth, Washington in the United States and is regarded as one of the most spectacular regions in the Cascade Range.

The population increase in western Washington, specifically in the city of Seattle, marked the region a prime outdoor destination for wilderness lovers. By 2019, 100,000 visitors made their way to The Enchantments annually. The influx in foot traffic and lack of maintenance from forest services and visitors had caused permanent damage to the delicate ecosystems in the region. As a result, the Alpine Lakes Wilderness Society (ALPS) proposed a permit system restricting access to a maximum of 60 people at any given time. In 2019, the system was approved and implemented by the Okanogan-Wenatchee National Forest (OWNF).

== History ==
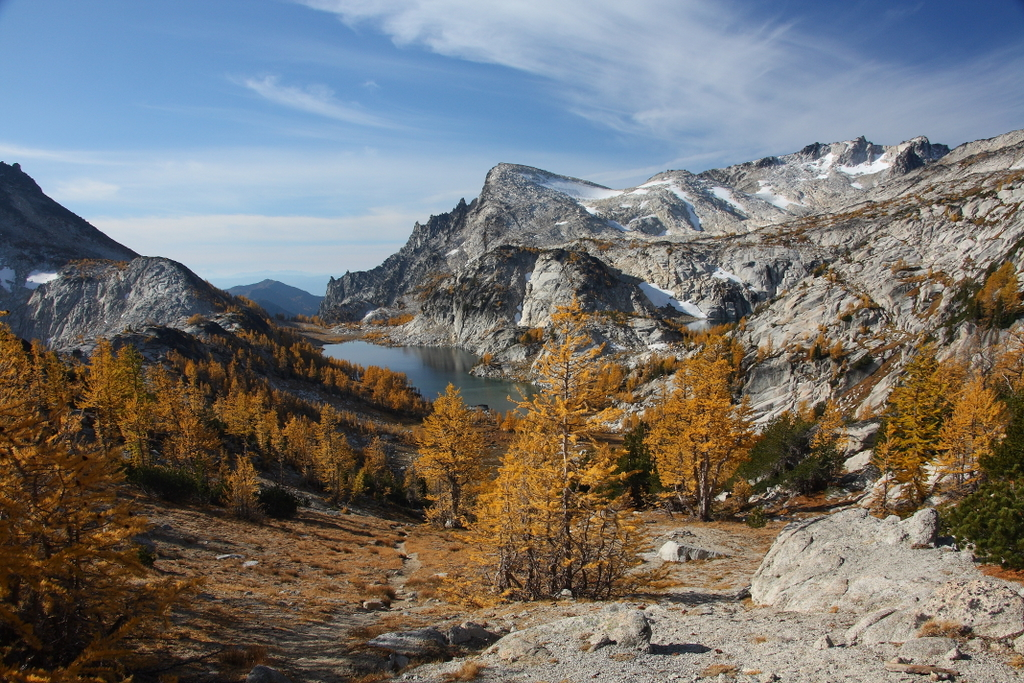
Enchantment Basin from Prusik Pass

Native American tribes, Yakima, Chinook and Wenatchi, traveled and thrived in and around The Enchantments region before it was ever discovered by western civilization. In the early 1900s, logging and mining had consumed much of the region. It was during this time that The Enchantments was named by European American, A.H. Sylvester, a topographer for the US Geological Survey in the Snoqualmie Ranger District from 1897 to 1907. During his time as Wenatchee Forest district supervisor from 1908 to 1931, Sylvester had come across the unmapped alpine lakes. While exploring much of the middle basin, the upper basin was likely covered thoroughly with snow from the Snow Creek Glacier. In a letter, he had described the area writing, "It was an enchanting scene. I named the group Enchantment Lakes."

By the 1940s climbers reached the area and began naming the crags. Bill and Peg Stark, of Leavenworth, became frequent visitors who drew upon various mythologies to name features of the landscape. When they made their first visit in the fall of 1959, they were captivated by the golden splendor of the larch trees in the fall, the numerous lakes and tarns, and jagged peaks towering above. They used fairy names such as Gnome Tarn, Troll Sink, Naiad Lake (officially Temple Lake), Sprite and King Arthur legends in the Lower Enchantment Basin because "the lower basin was not as austere as the upper basin", according to Peg. They used Norse names and mythology for features of the upper basin, for example Lake Brynhild (officially Isolation Lake), Lake Freya (officially Tranquil Lake), and Valhalla Cirque because, Peg said, it felt "as if the Ice Age had just gone off."

The official naming rulings of the US Board on Geographic Names in the 1960s resulted in a mixture of two name sets being adopted as official, particularly for the lakes, but also exemplified by the feature popularly known as Aasgard Pass being officially designated Colchuck Pass. Different sources still use the unofficial names in some contexts. The current policy of not adopting new names for geographic features in wilderness areas probably precludes the rest of the names identified by the Starks from achieving official status.

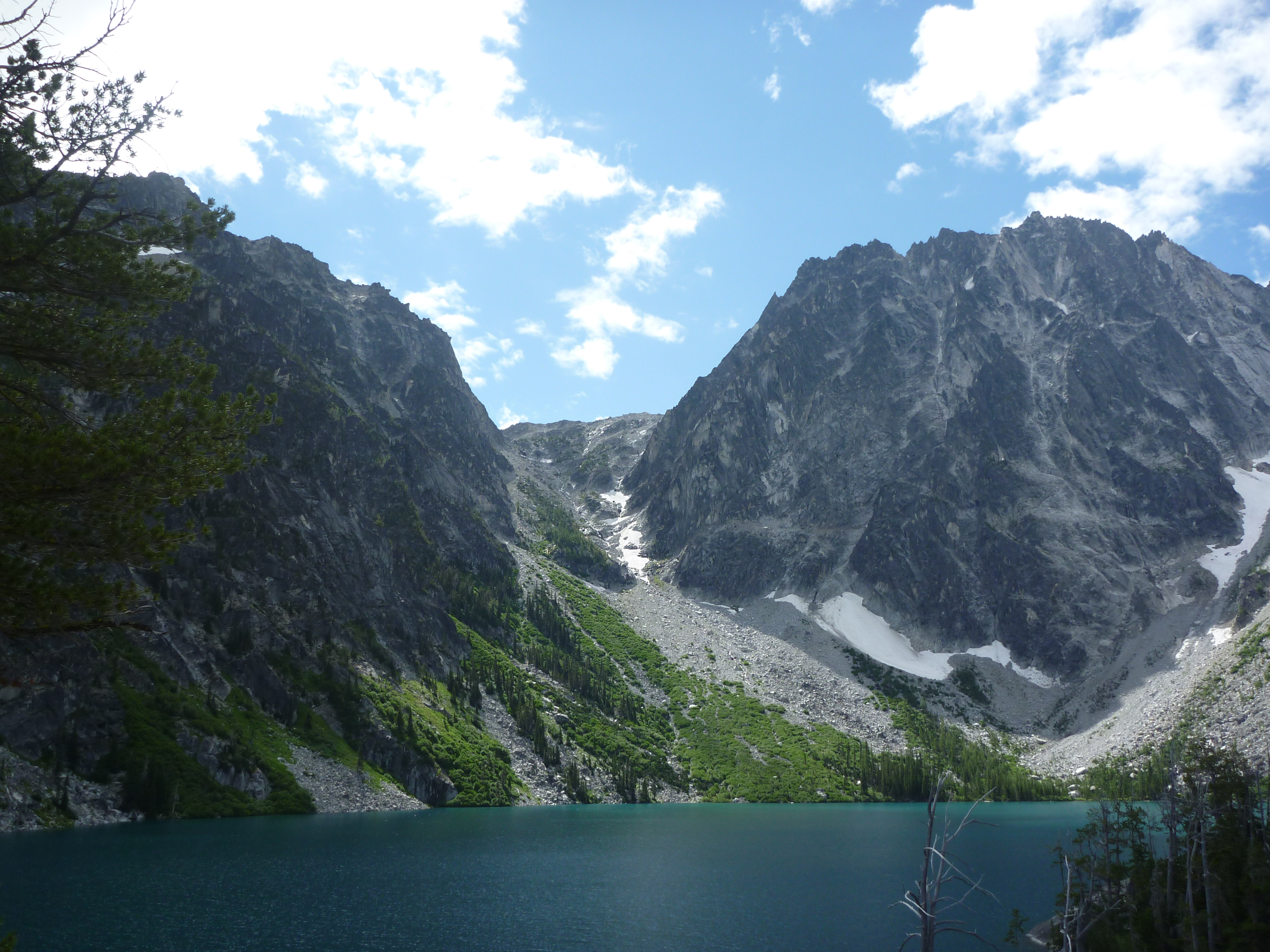
Aasgard Pass is a very steep approach to the Enchantments

== Ecology ==
The elevation of The Enchantments range from 5,000 feet (1,500 m) at Nada Lake to 7,800 feet (2,400 m) in the Upper Enchantments to 8,840 feet (2,690 m) at the summit of Dragontail Peak. The treeline is approximately 6,400 feet (2,000 m) above Snow Lake. The EPA ecoregion below the treeline is 77g, "Wenatchee/Chelan Highlands", dominated by Douglas fir, grand fir, and Subalpine fir. Lodgepole pine, Engelmann spruce, and vine maple are also present. Slide alder grows in avalanche chutes.

The alpine zone lies above the treeline. The climate of the alpine zone is too harsh for trees to grow, but the zone is home to a number of alpine flowers: Dryas octopetala, Phacelia sericea, Saxifraga oppositifolia, Anemone drummondii, and the endemic Erigeron salishii. A number of animals are permanent residents of the alpine zone: white-tailed ptarmigan, hoary marmots, and pikas.

== Conservation ==
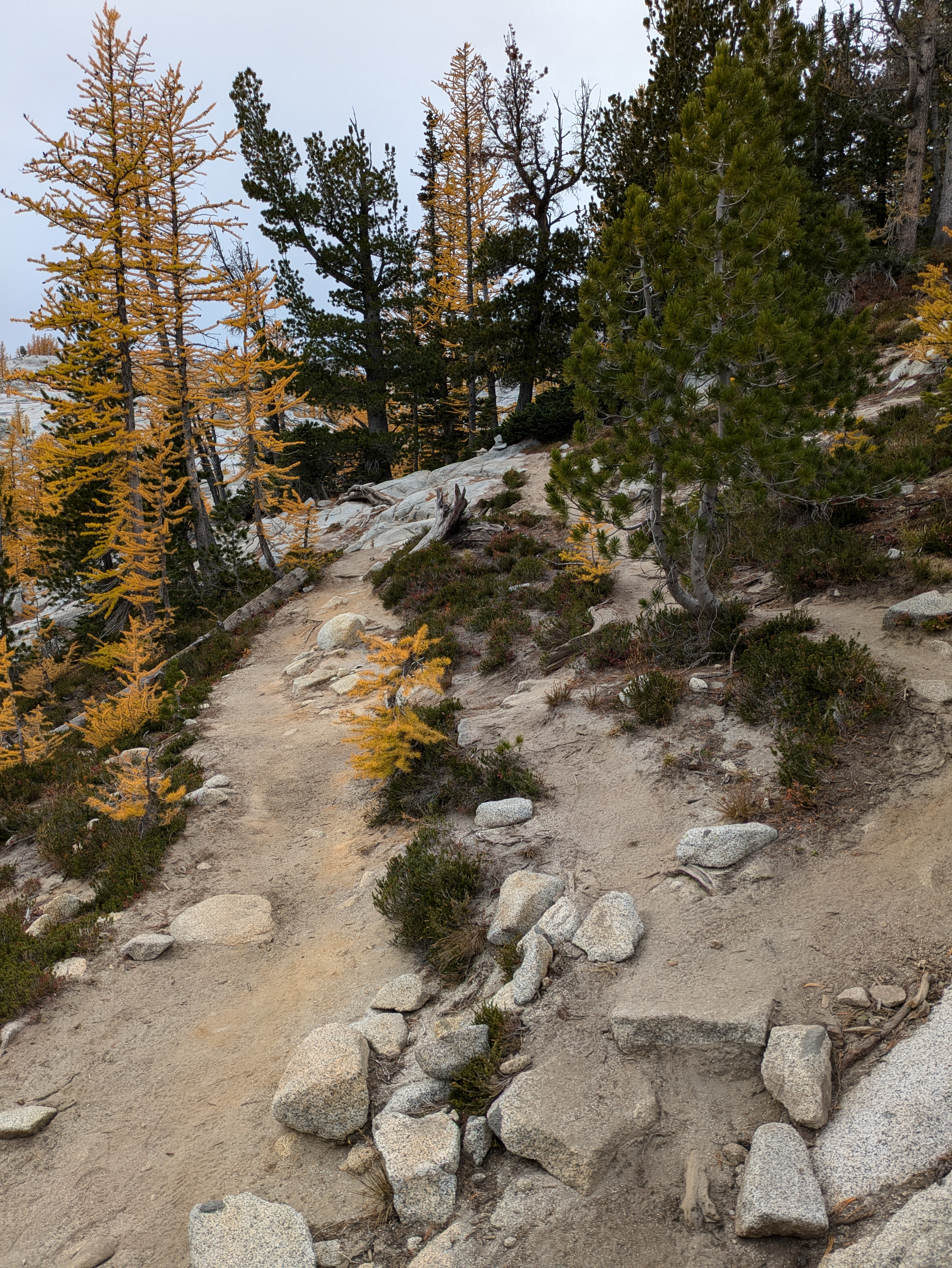
The trail through the Enchantments is poorly marked, leading multiple routes to develop without any indication which one is official (near Perfection Lake on 11 October 2024)

The number of visitors to the Enchantments has exponentially increased largely due to the fast growing population in the western region of Washington state. By the late 1970s, up to 300 people would be found camping in the basin on summer weekends. The Forest Service installed toilets in 1966, restricted horses in 1972, and banned dogs in 1982. By 2019, 100,000 people would visit The Enchantments annually. In 1987, a permit system was implemented to prevent further destruction of the region, restricting access to only 60 campers into the region at any given time. After the ban on dogs, the population of mountain goats and ptarmigan recovered.

Both the rocky alpine and subalpine meadows of The Enchantments sustain highly sensitive ecosystems. At such high elevation, vegetation are particularly vulnerable to foot traffic due to their short growing season, sparsity and low resilience to changes in their environment. In 2016 the ALPS proposed a permit-system that would regulate the number of visitors allowed to stay overnight in the region in order to prevent further landscape destruction. In October 2018, the OWNF approved the permit system effective in 2019.

In 2016, Chelan County and the Washington State Department of Ecology had proposed the Icicle Strategy plan to resolve the shortage of water supply that threatened irrigation, fish habitat and passage, and tribal and non-tribal fisheries in the Icicle Creek subbasin region. The purpose of the plan was to improve stream flow and water availability into the subbasin that previously relied heavily on the tight stream of Icicle Creek.

Particularly during seasons of drought, Icicle Creek would often fail to meet minimum adopted levels. In 2018, the plan was approved by the Washington State Department of Ecology. The Icicle Strategy directly impacted seven subbasin lake reservoirs in The Enchantments, optimizing, modernizing and automating the outlet works and gate infrastructures. It also restored the dam infrastructure at Eightmile Lake, also in The Enchantments, permitting higher levels of water storage. Although there were concerns for flooding in and around the areas surrounding each lake and the possibility of damaging trails and vegetation, the positive impacts outweighed the risks; habitat protection, fish passage, fish screening and water conservation efficiencies.

== Hiking ==
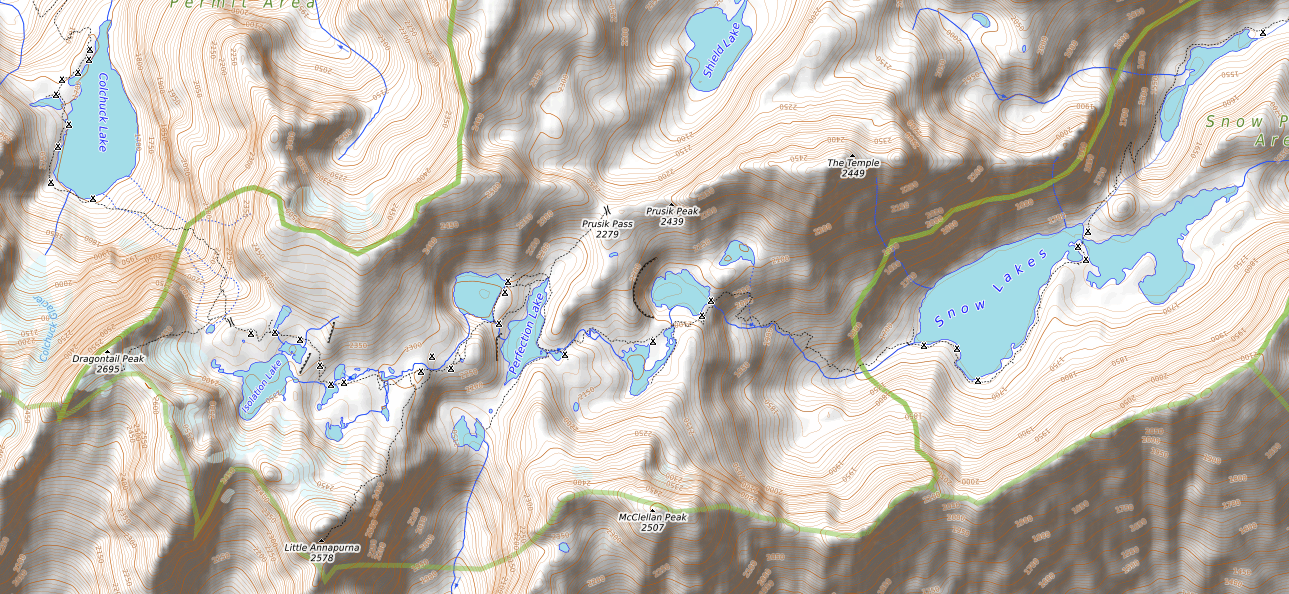
OpenTopoMap of the Enchantment Lakes

There are two primary approaches to the Enchantments Basin. Both trail heads are accessed via Icicle Creek Road. The Snow Lakes trailhead is off Icicle Creek Road at a large parking lot next to the creek. The trail climbs 6.5 miles (10.5 km) to Snow Lakes gaining 4,100 feet (1,200 m). From Snow Lakes the trail ascends over sloping granite rock to the Lower Enchantments. The entire hike is 9 miles (14 km) one-way, with 6,000 feet (1,800 m) of elevation gain to an end elevation of 7,800 feet (2,400 m). This hike usually takes two days each way and is described as "long, steep, and grueling." The alternate route is from the Stuart Lake trail head a couple of miles up Eightmile road off Icicle Creek Road. The trail up to Colchuck Lake is 4.75 miles (7.64 km) long and gains 2,100 feet (640 m); another 1.75 miles (2.82 km) bring hikers to the south end of the lake and Aasgard Pass, which climbs 2,200 feet (670 m) in 0.8 miles (1.3 km). Aasgard Pass is a steep scramble which is dangerous to descend in snow. The Aasgard Pass route has also been described as "in very bad taste" because it bypasses the beauty of the lower basin to get to the upper basin first. The two routes can be combined to form a loop if the hiking party has two cars, a bicycle, or otherwise arranges transportation between the trail heads.

The United States Forest Service restricts access to the Enchantments permit area, which includes five zones. The three most popular zones are the Snow Zone (from Icicle Creek up to Snow Lakes), the Colchuck Zone (the area surrounding Colchuck Lake) and the Core Enchantment Zone (the Upper and Lower Enchantment Basins and surrounding peaks). The other zones are the Stuart Zone (the area around Stuart Lake and the northern approaches to Mount Stuart) and the Eightmile/Caroline Zone (Eightmile Lake, Eightmile Mountain, Cashmere Mountain, and vicinity). In addition, the Forest Service has proposed adding the Ingalls Lake, Headlight Basin, and Mount Stuart areas to the permit area in accordance with a 1993 NEPA decision. The earliest the change could be implemented is 2010.

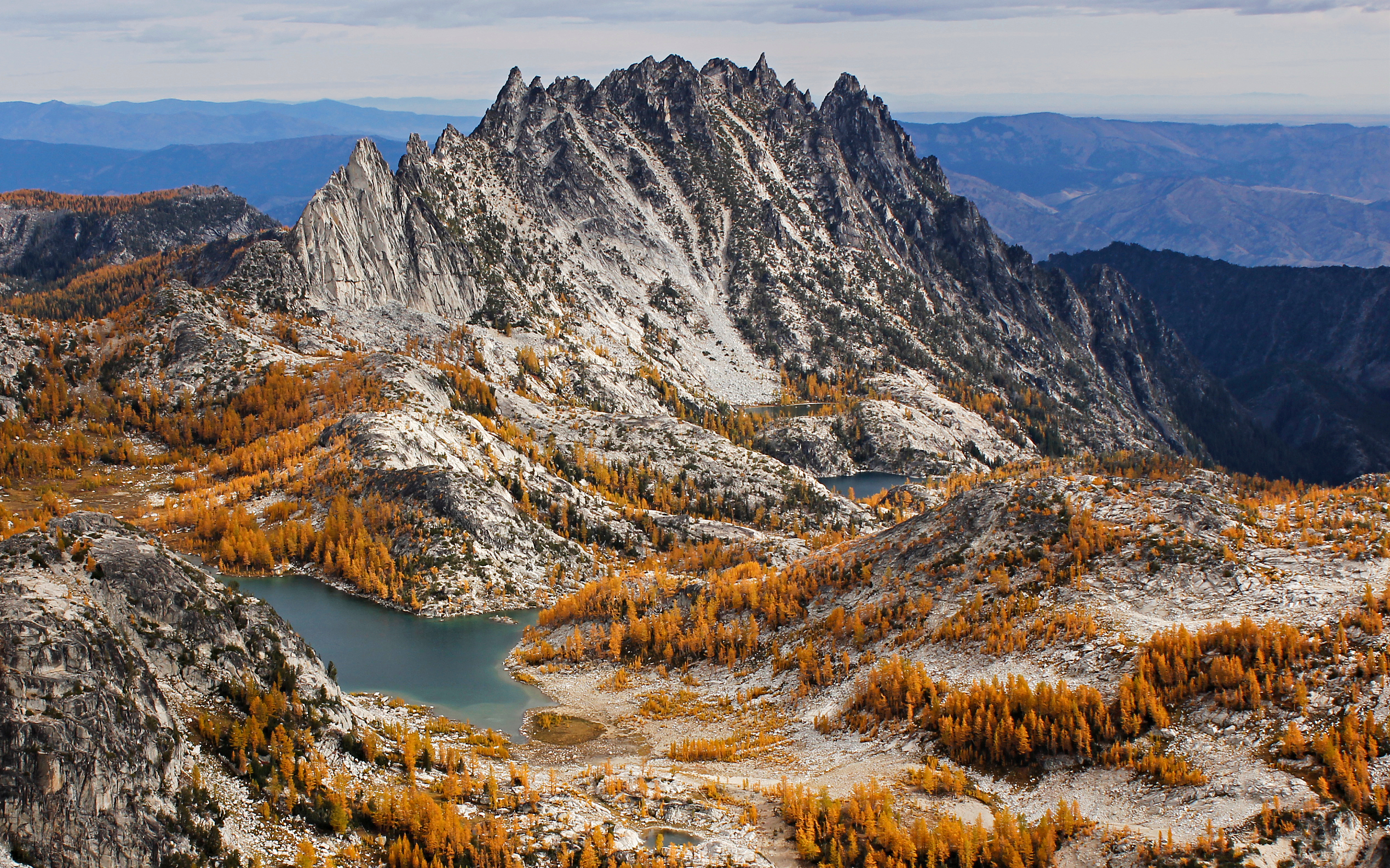
The Temple seen from Little Annapurna

The 1981 Alpine Lakes Wilderness Plan established a quota of 60 people at one time as the carrying capacity of the Core Enchantment Zone. For overnight camping between May 15 and October 31 hikers in any of the five currently established zones must have permits. 75 percent of the permits for each hiking season are awarded in advance by lottery. The first round of the (very competitive) lottery includes all applications received between February 15, 2016 (12:01 a.m. PT) and March 2, 2016 (11:59 p.m. PT) for the 2016 season. All applications received during this period will be randomly drawn on or around March 6. The other 25 percent of permits are issued each morning (except Sunday) at 7:45 a.m. at the Leavenworth ranger station for trips beginning the same day. If not enough permits are available for the day's applicants, the permits are awarded by lottery.
