= Colchuck Lake =

Lake in Washington, United States

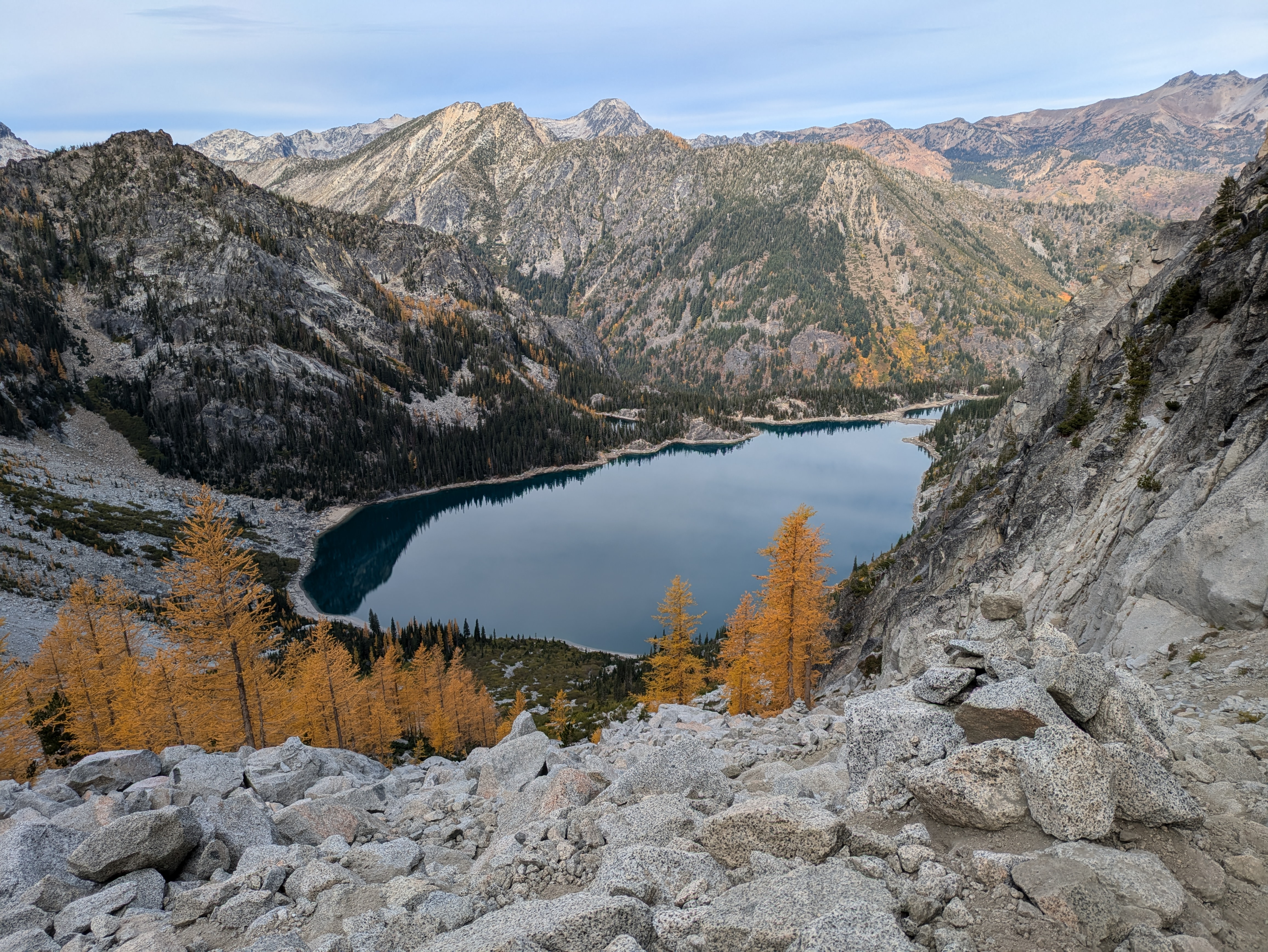
- Colchuck Lake from halfway up Aasgard Pass, 11 October 2024

- Location within Washington (state) Location within the United States
- Location: Chelan County, Washington, United States
- Coordinates: 47°29′32″N 120°49′59″W
- Primary outflows: Mountaineer creek
- Basin countries: United States
- Surface area: 87.8 acres (0.355 km^{2})
- Surface elevation: 1,695 m (5,561 ft)

Colchuck Lake is a freshwater reservoir lake located on the western slope of the Enchantments, in Chelan County, Washington. The lake is located approximately 15 miles from the city of Leavenworth, Washington and sits on the southeast corner of the Icicle Creek subbasin. It is accessed by a 4-mile trail that starts at USFS Road 7601 as it crosses over Eightmile Creek and makes a turn towards the Stuart and Colchuck Lake Trailhead where the road ends. The name comes from the Chinook Jargon word meaning "cold water" or "ice".

== History ==
Icicle Irrigation District applied in 1926 for the right to divert water from Colchuck Lake at a rate of 50 cfs (cubic feet per second), 2,500 acre-feet per year for seasonal irrigation purposes. The State Supervisor of Hydraulics issued Permit Number 828 in January 1927 for the requested amount. The irrigation district also sought permission to raise the lake levels because of inadequate summer flows for irrigation. The Department of Public Lands approved this request in a 1927 order that allowed the irrigation district to inundate lakeshores on the lake.

== Hydrology ==
Colchuck Lake has an area of approximately 87.8 acres (0.355 km^{2}) and a maximum surface elevation of 5,570 feet above sea level, depending on the fluctuation of the depth of the lake. The lake has a tributary basin of 941 acres (3.81 km^{2}) acres, and an average storage capacity estimated at 1,570 acre-feet.

=== Dam ===
Colchuck Lake is contained by a masonry dam constructed in the late 1930s out of cement with a spillway opening at the center of the dam to control overflow. Operation of flow through the outlet is controlled by a valve located 20 feet (6.1 m) south of the spillway supported by a concrete pedestal that rises 2 feet above high water level. The depth to the gate from the top of the concrete pedestal is approximately 16 feet (4.9 m). The gate allows for water discharge through the low-level outlet pipe to an unnamed creek, which flows into Mountaineer Creek, a tributary of Icicle Creek.

== Geography ==
Colchuck Lake sits in a basin consisting of rocky soils and igneous tonalite geology. The bedrock is about 3 feet from the surface and mapped as granites of the Mount Stuart Batholith (Mesozoic intrusive rocks) and ultramafic/metamorphic of the Ingalls Tectonic Complex (Mesozoic-Paleozoic ultramafic rocks). The trail to the lake consists of sandy loam the first half and boulders added in the second half of the trajectory.

== Uses ==
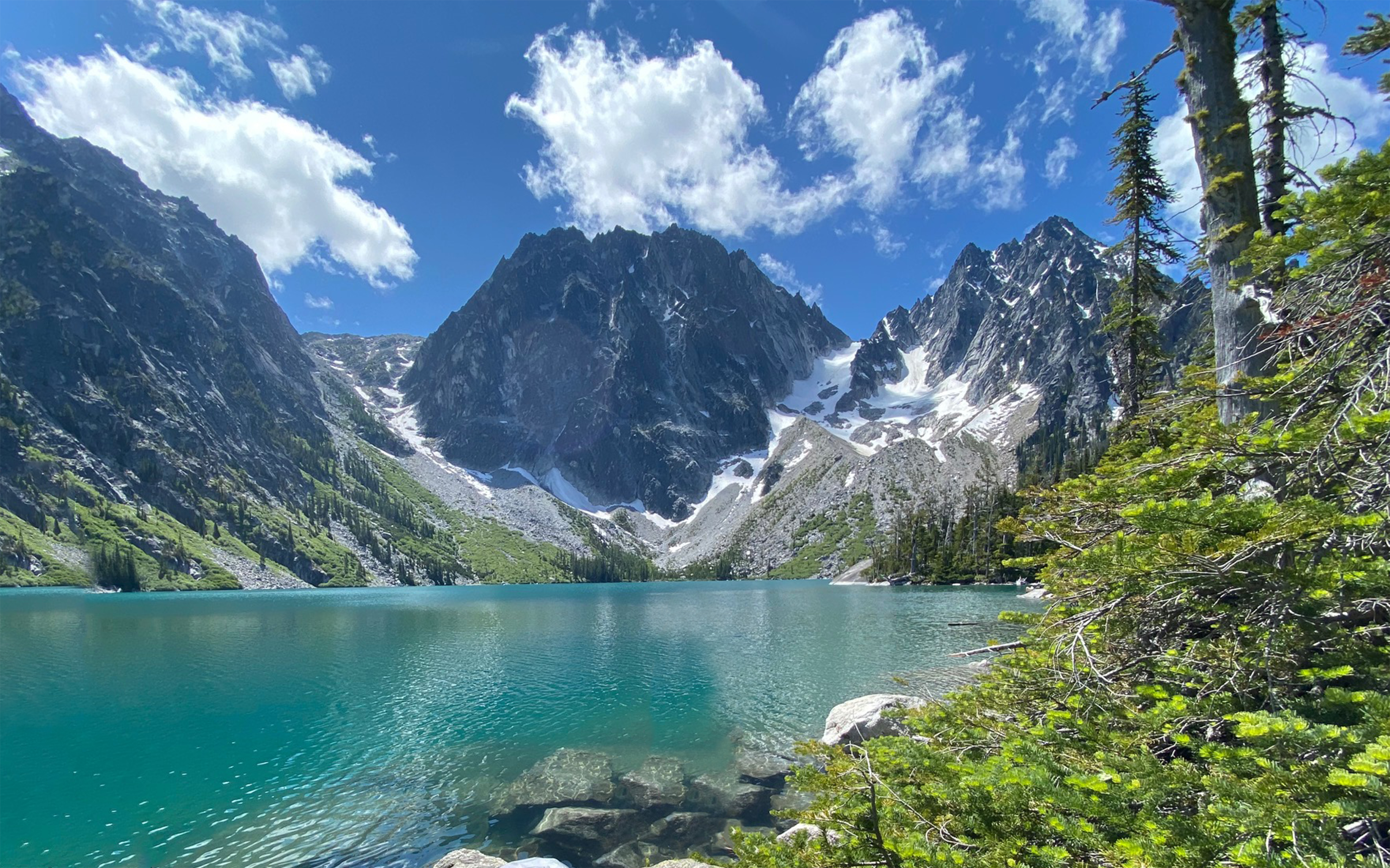
Aasgard Pass (left) and Dragontail Peak (center) above Colchuck Lake

Colchuck Lake is managed by the Icicle and Peshastin Irrigation Districts (IPID) to provide water storage for irrigation. The lake captures water runoff at the far southeast of a 3,800-acre drainage basin which gives the lake a high potential for refill, even during dry years. The reservoir is contained by a small dam consisting of a rock and masonry structure with stop logs and an earthen embankment section that extends from the rock-masonry/concrete structure to the hillside north of the dam. The dam is fitted with a low-level outlet pipeline and a slide gate at the outlet of the lake. This infrastructure allows for controlled releases of stored water to supplement flows into Icicle Creek through its outflowing tributaries and increase the water supply available during low flow periods, which typically occur during the late summer.

== Access ==
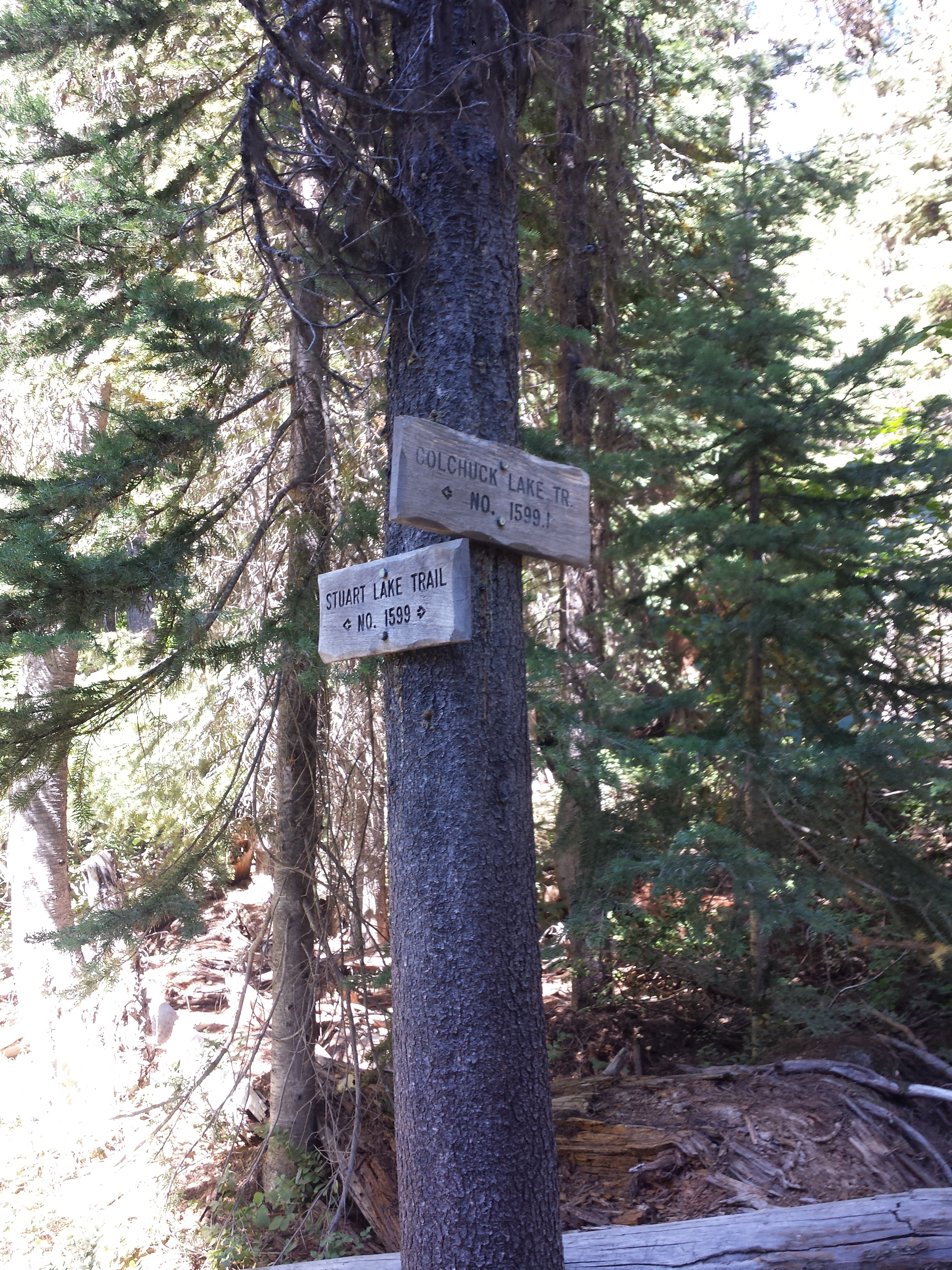
Lake Stuart-Colchuck Lake intersection

The foot trail starts at the trailhead at the end of USFS Road 7601 becoming Stuart Lake Trail #1599. The trail eventually crosses over Mountaineer Creek about 1.5 miles from the trailhead by way of a wooden bridge. The trail will fork in two less than a mile from the bridge, to the right is the trail to Stuart Lake and to the left is Colchuck Lake Trail #1599.1 towards Colchuck Lake. The trail has a second bridge over Mountaineer Creek shortly after the split fork.

A self-issued Alpine Lake Wilderness permit is required for day use within the Colchuck Lake area. An Enchantments permit (Core or Colchuck Zone) is required for overnight camping between May 15 and August 31.

== See also ==
- List of lakes of the Alpine Lakes Wilderness
- Colchuck Balanced Rock
