= Bills Peak =

Mountain in Washington (state), United States

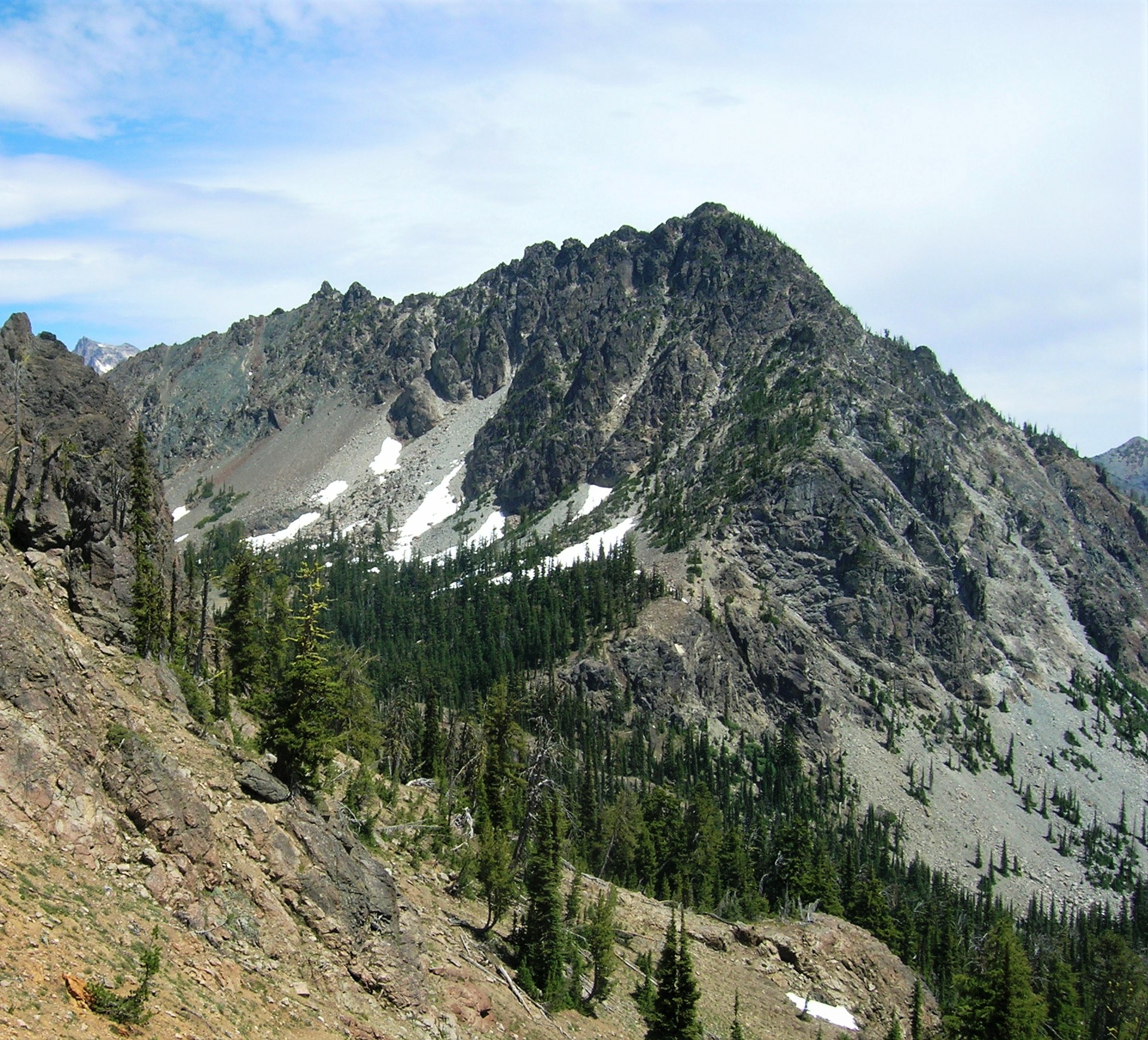
- Southwest aspect

Highest point
- Elevation: 6,917 ft (2,108 m)
- Prominence: 1,077 ft (328 m)
- Parent peak: Earl Peak (7,036 ft)
- Isolation: 2.61 mi (4.20 km)
- Coordinates: 47°25′40″N 120°53′31″W

Geography
- Location within Washington (state) Location within the United States
- Location: Kittitas County / Chelan County; Washington, U.S.
- Parent range: Wenatchee Mountains; Cascade Range
- Topo map: USGS Mount Stuart

Climbing
- Easiest route: class 3 scrambling

Bills Peak is a 6,917-foot (2,108-metre) mountain summit located on the common border of Kittitas County with Chelan County in Washington state. It is the tenth-highest point in the Teanaway area of the Wenatchee Mountains. Bills Peak is situated 2.6 mi (4.2 km) west-northwest of Earl Peak, its nearest higher neighbor, on the boundary of the Alpine Lakes Wilderness, on land managed by Wenatchee National Forest. Precipitation runoff from the peak drains south into tributaries of the Teanaway River, or north into tributaries of Ingalls Creek which is part of the Wenatchee River drainage basin. The view from the summit of this peak showcases the impressive Mount Stuart and Stuart Range. Bills Peak was named after William Noble "Bill" Prater (1926–2010), a mountaineer and farmer from nearby Ellensburg.

== Bill Prater ==
Bill Prater is credited with making the first ascents of nearby Argonaut Peak and Sherpa Peak in 1955, as well as Mount Kennedy in Yukon, Canada, in 1965.

In December 1960, a party consisting of Bill Prater, his younger brother Gene, and two others were making a winter ascent of this peak. As they neared the summit an avalanche struck, sweeping the Prater brothers downslope. Bill was most severely injured and required a rescue team to evacuate him.

In the early 1970s, brothers Gene and Bill Prater created the modern aluminum snowshoe known today, and sold them via Bill's "Sherpa Snowshoes" company, which proved very popular.

== Climate ==
Lying east of the Cascade crest, the area around Bills Peak is a bit drier than areas to the west. Summers can bring warm temperatures and occasional thunderstorms. Most weather fronts originate in the Pacific Ocean, and travel east toward the Cascade Mountains. As fronts approach, they are forced upward by the peaks of the Cascade Range, causing them to drop their moisture in the form of rain or snowfall onto the Cascades (Orographic lift). As a result, the eastern slopes of the Cascades experience lower precipitation than the western slopes. During winter months, weather is usually cloudy, but, due to high pressure systems over the Pacific Ocean that intensify during summer months, there is often little or no cloud cover during the summer.

== Geology ==
The Alpine Lakes Wilderness features some of the most rugged topography in the Cascade Range with craggy peaks and ridges, deep glacial valleys, and granite walls spotted with over 700 mountain lakes. Geological events occurring many years ago created the diverse topography and drastic elevation changes over the Cascade Range leading to the various climate differences.

The history of the formation of the Cascade Mountains dates back millions of years ago to the late Eocene Epoch. With the North American Plate overriding the Pacific Plate, episodes of volcanic igneous activity persisted. In addition, small fragments of the oceanic and continental lithosphere called terranes created the North Cascades about 50 million years ago.

During the Pleistocene period dating back over two million years ago, glaciation advancing and retreating repeatedly scoured and shaped the landscape. The last glacial retreat in the Alpine Lakes area began about 14,000 years ago and was north of the Canada–US border by 10,000 years ago. The U-shaped cross section of the river valleys is a result of that recent glaciation. Uplift and faulting in combination with glaciation have been the dominant processes which have created the tall peaks and deep valleys of the Alpine Lakes Wilderness area.

== Gallery ==
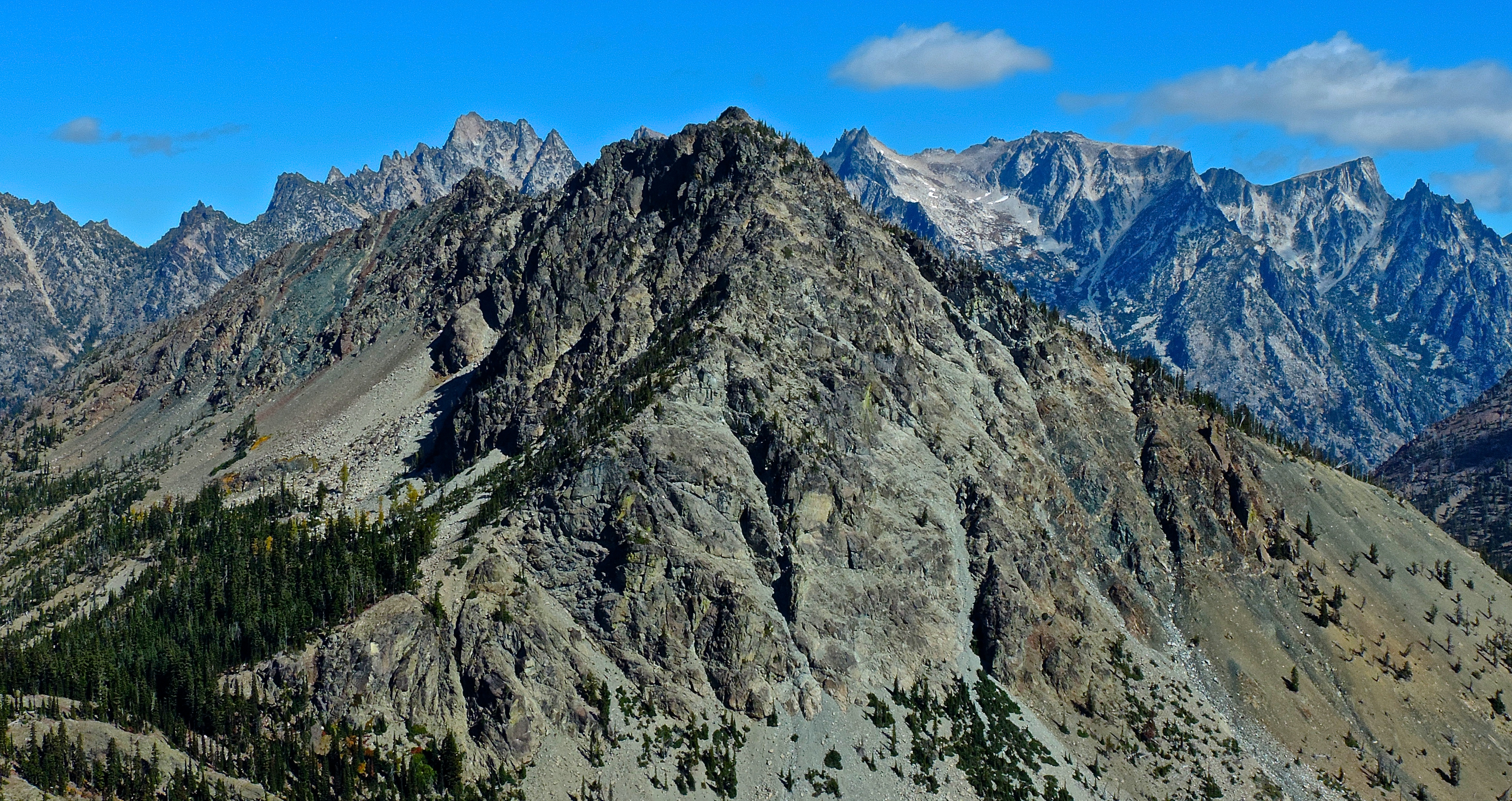
South aspect from Iron Peak, with Stuart Range in back

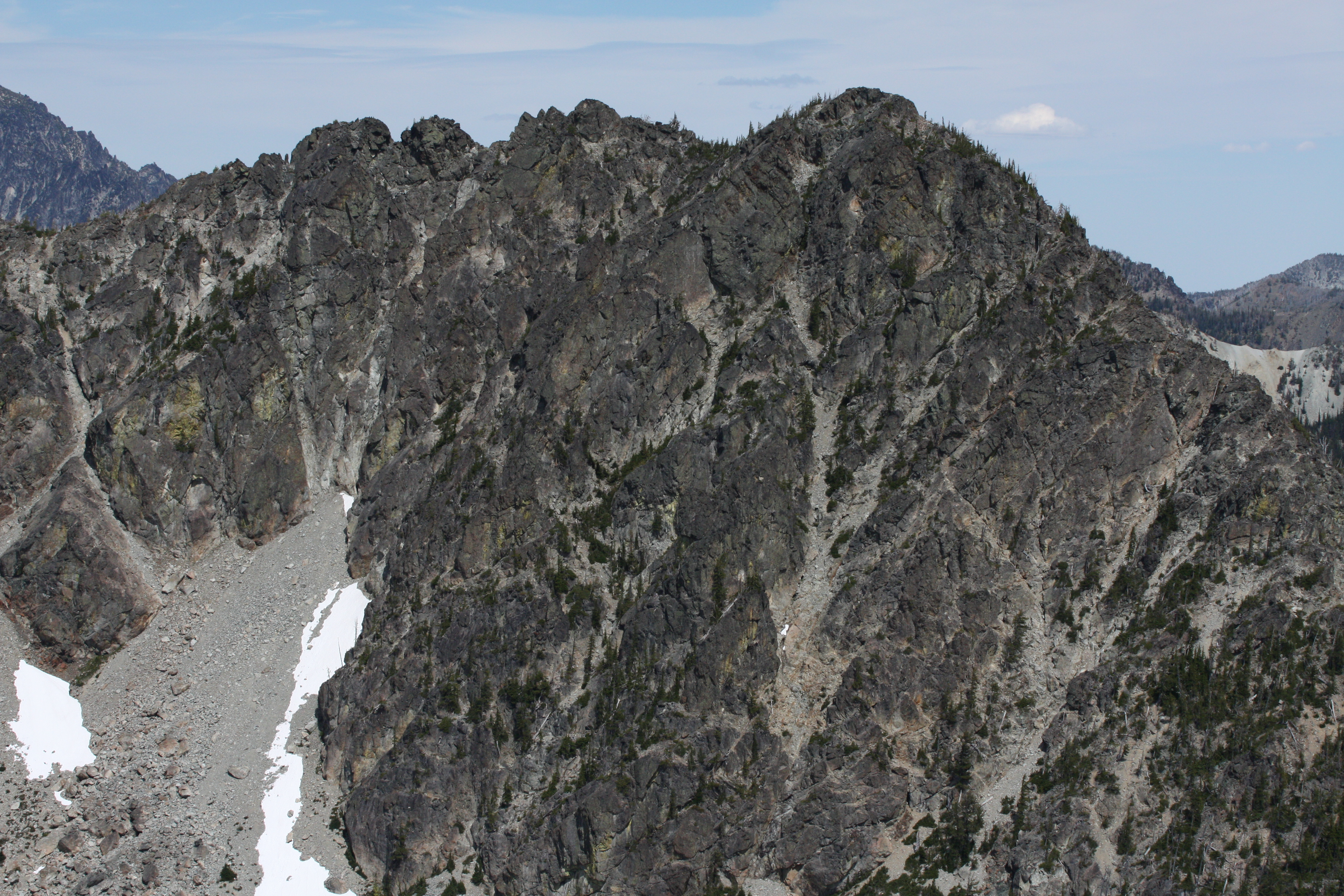
West aspect, from Teanaway Peak aka Genes Peak

== See also ==
- Geology of the Pacific Northwest
- List of peaks of the Alpine Lakes Wilderness
