= Navaho Peak =

Mountain in Washington (state), United States

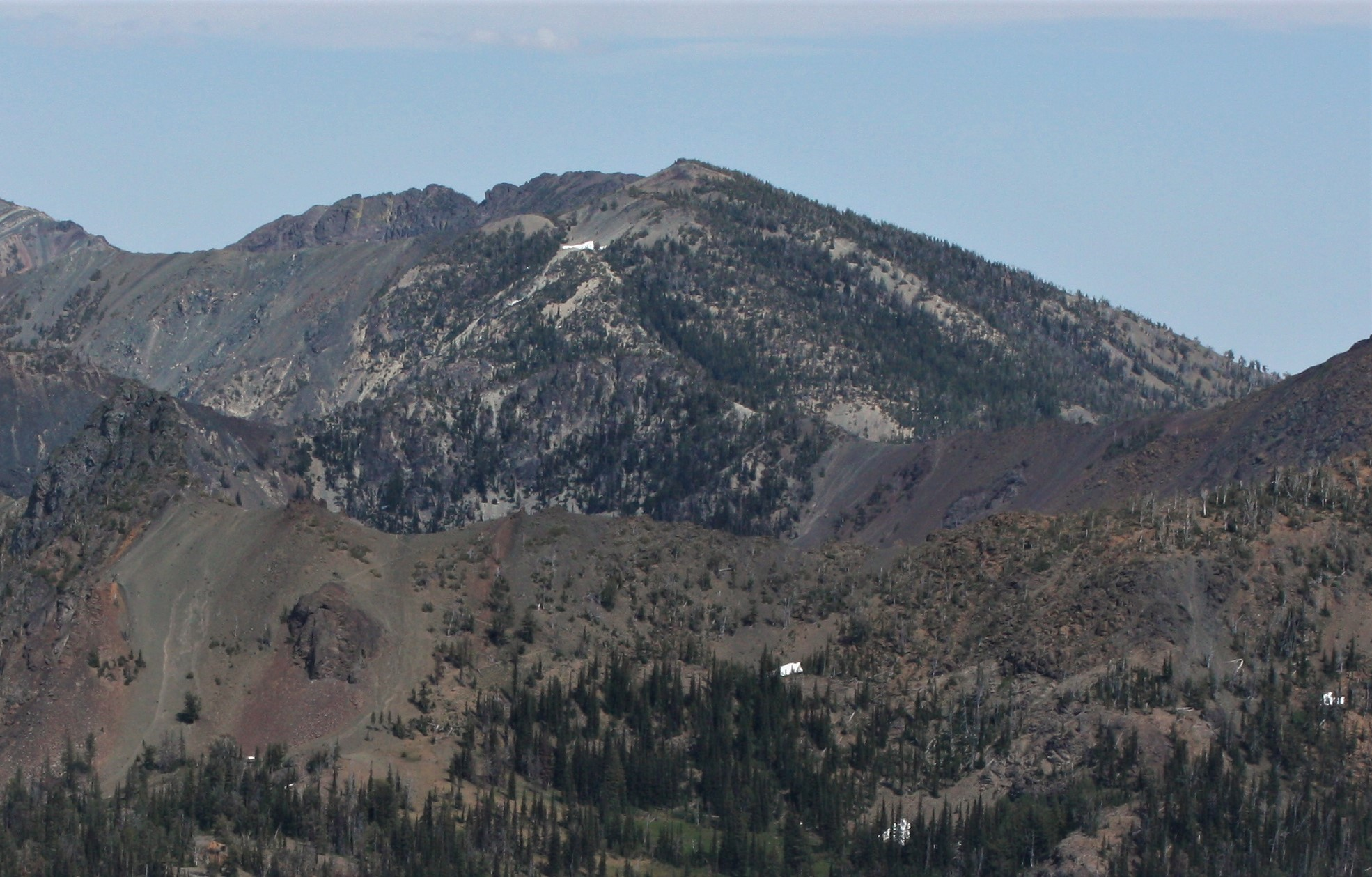
- West aspect, from Teanaway Peak

Highest point
- Elevation: 7,223 ft (2,202 m)
- Prominence: 1,143 ft (348 m)
- Parent peak: Three Brothers (7,303 ft)
- Isolation: 1.3 mi (2.1 km)
- Coordinates: 47°25′23″N 120°48′13″W

Geography
- Location within Washington (state) Location within the United States
- Country: United States of America
- State: Washington
- County: Chelan / Kittitas
- Protected area: Alpine Lakes Wilderness
- Parent range: Wenatchee Mountains; Cascade Range
- Topo map: USGS Enchantment Lakes

Climbing
- Easiest route: class 2 hiking

Navaho Peak is a 7,223-foot (2,202-metre) mountain summit located on the boundary of the Alpine Lakes Wilderness, on the shared border of Kittitas County with Chelan County in Washington state. Navaho Peak is the fourth-highest point in the Teanaway area of the Wenatchee Mountains. It is situated two miles northeast of Earl Peak, and 1.3 miles west of Three Brothers, on land managed by Wenatchee National Forest. Precipitation runoff from the peak drains south into tributaries of the Teanaway River, or north into tributaries of Ingalls Creek which is part of the Wenatchee River drainage basin. The view from the summit of this peak showcases the impressive Mount Stuart and Stuart Range for those who climb it.

== Climate ==
Lying east of the Cascade crest, the area around Navaho Peak is a bit drier than areas to the west. Summers can bring warm temperatures and occasional thunderstorms. Weather fronts originating in the Pacific Ocean travel east toward the Cascade Mountains. As fronts approach, they are forced upward by the peaks (orographic lift), causing them to drop their moisture in the form of rain or snowfall onto the Cascades. As a result, the eastern slopes of the Cascades experience lower precipitation than the western slopes. During winter months, weather is usually cloudy, but due to high pressure systems over the Pacific Ocean that intensify during summer months, there is often little or no cloud cover during the summer.

== Geology ==
The Alpine Lakes Wilderness features some of the most rugged topography in the Cascade Range with craggy peaks and ridges, deep glacial valleys, and granite walls spotted with over 700 mountain lakes. Geological events occurring many years ago created the diverse topography and drastic elevation changes over the Cascade Range leading to the various climate differences. The elevation range of this area is between about 1,000 feet (300 m) in the lower elevations to over 9,000 feet (2,700 m) on Mount Stuart.

The history of the formation of the Cascade Mountains dates back millions of years ago to the late Eocene Epoch. With the North American Plate overriding the Pacific Plate, episodes of volcanic igneous activity persisted. In addition, small fragments of the oceanic and continental lithosphere called terranes created the North Cascades about 50 million years ago.

During the Pleistocene period dating back over two million years ago, glaciation advancing and retreating repeatedly scoured and shaped the landscape. The last glacial retreat in the Alpine Lakes area began about 14,000 years ago and was north of the Canada–US border by 10,000 years ago. The U-shaped cross section of the river valleys is a result of that recent glaciation. Uplift and faulting in combination with glaciation have been the dominant processes which have created the tall peaks and deep valleys of the Alpine Lakes Wilderness area.

== See also ==
- Geology of the Pacific Northwest
- List of peaks of the Alpine Lakes Wilderness

== Gallery ==
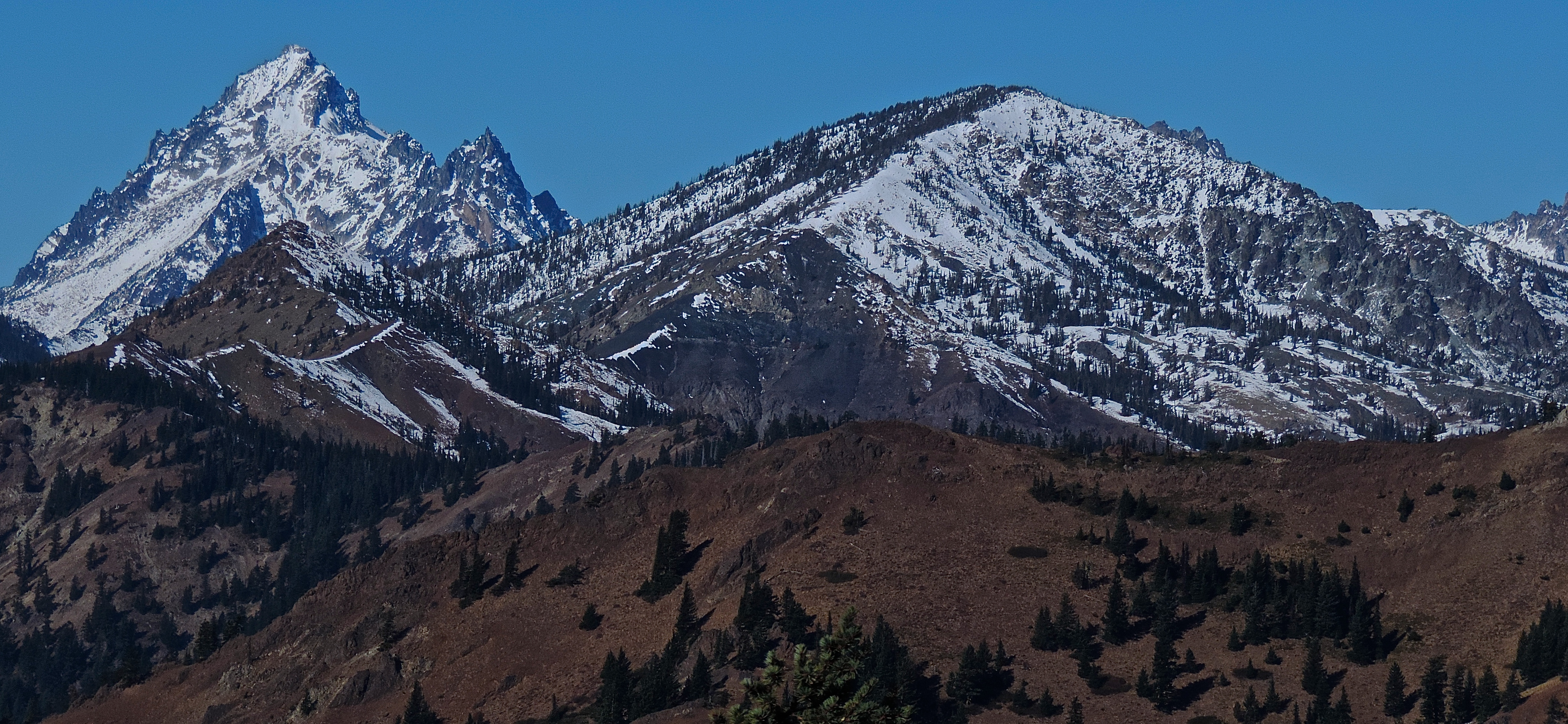
Mt. Stuart (left) and Navaho Peak, from southeast

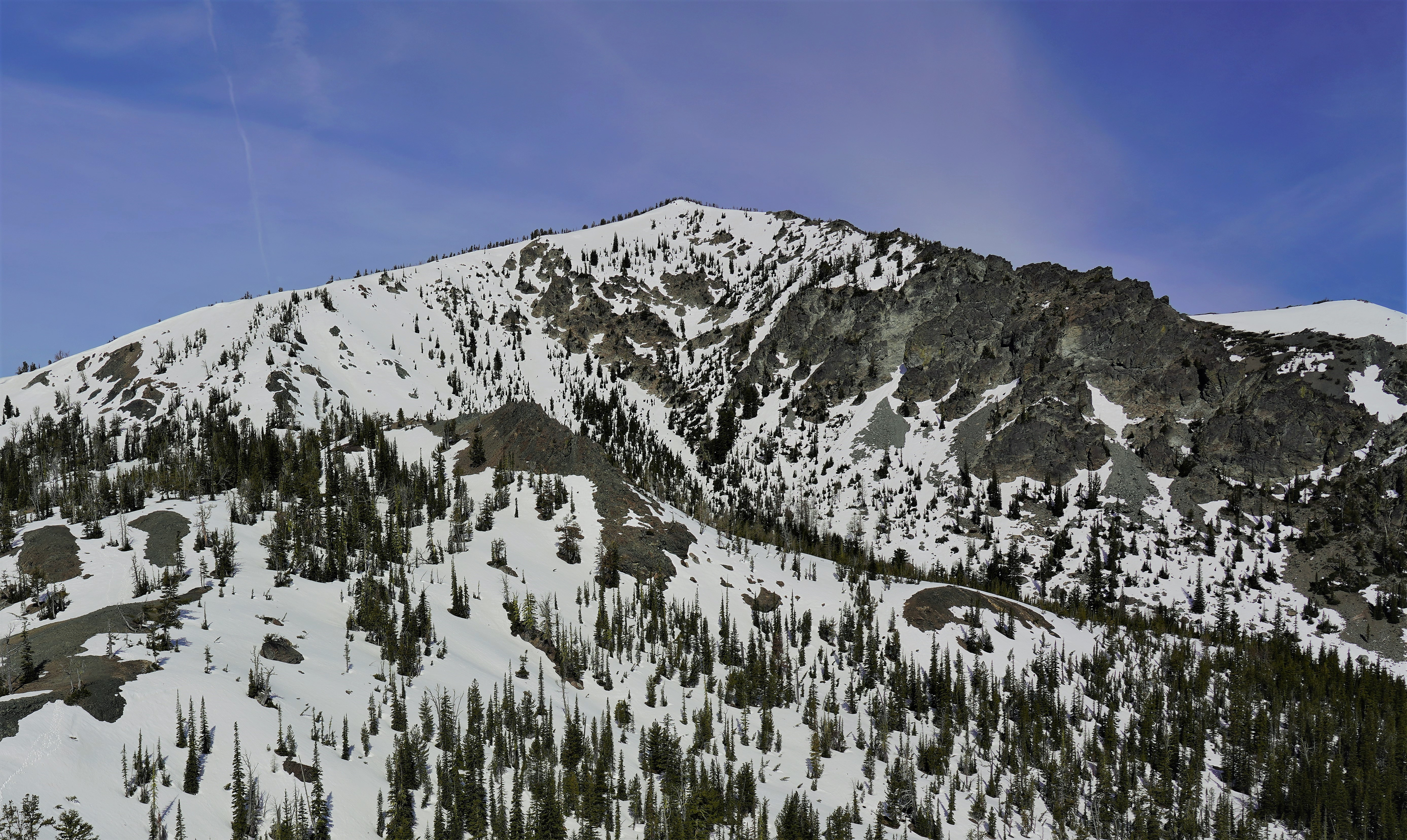
East aspect

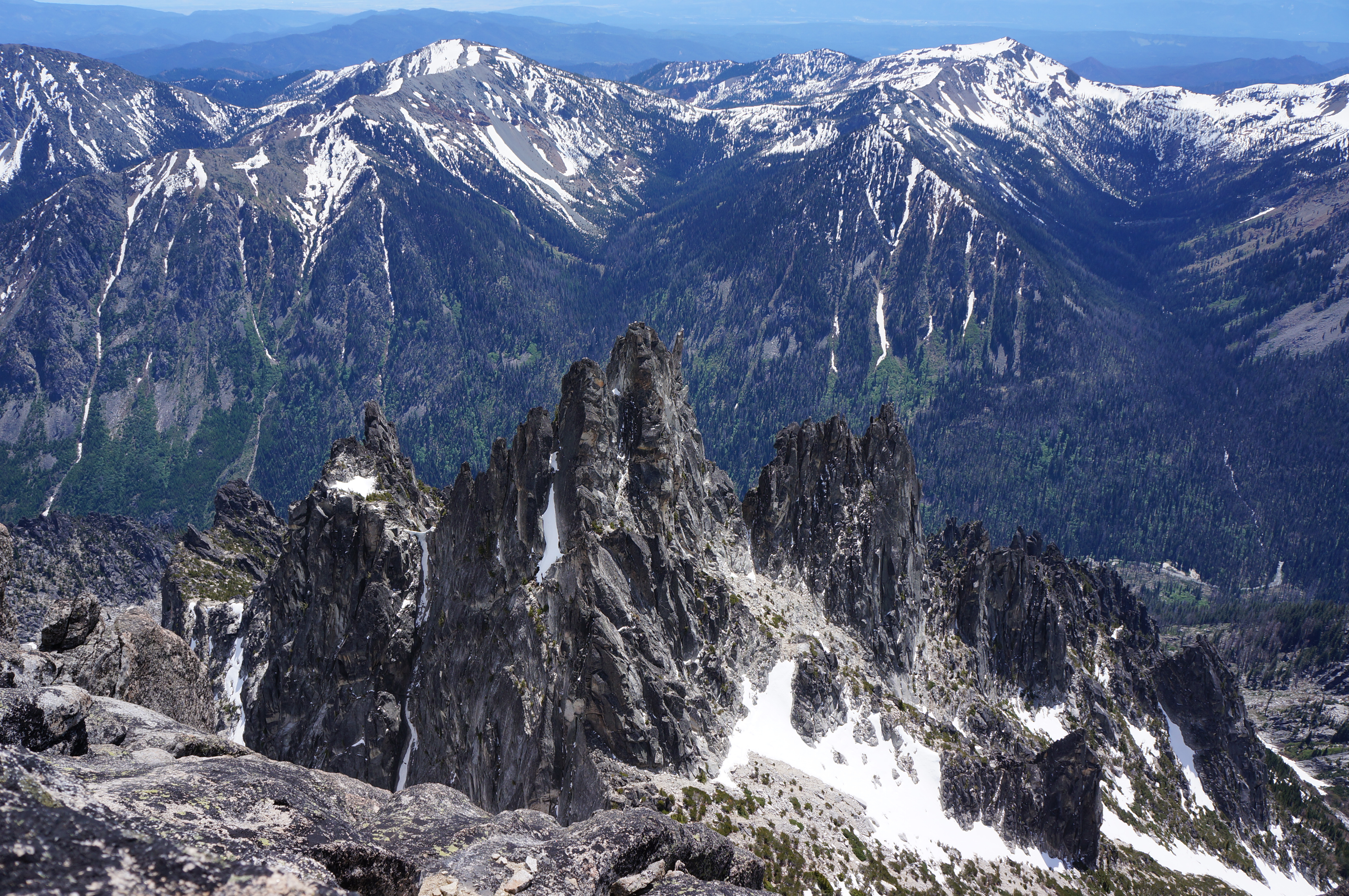
Navaho Peak (left) and Earl Peak (right)
from Little Annapurna, Nightmare Needles centered

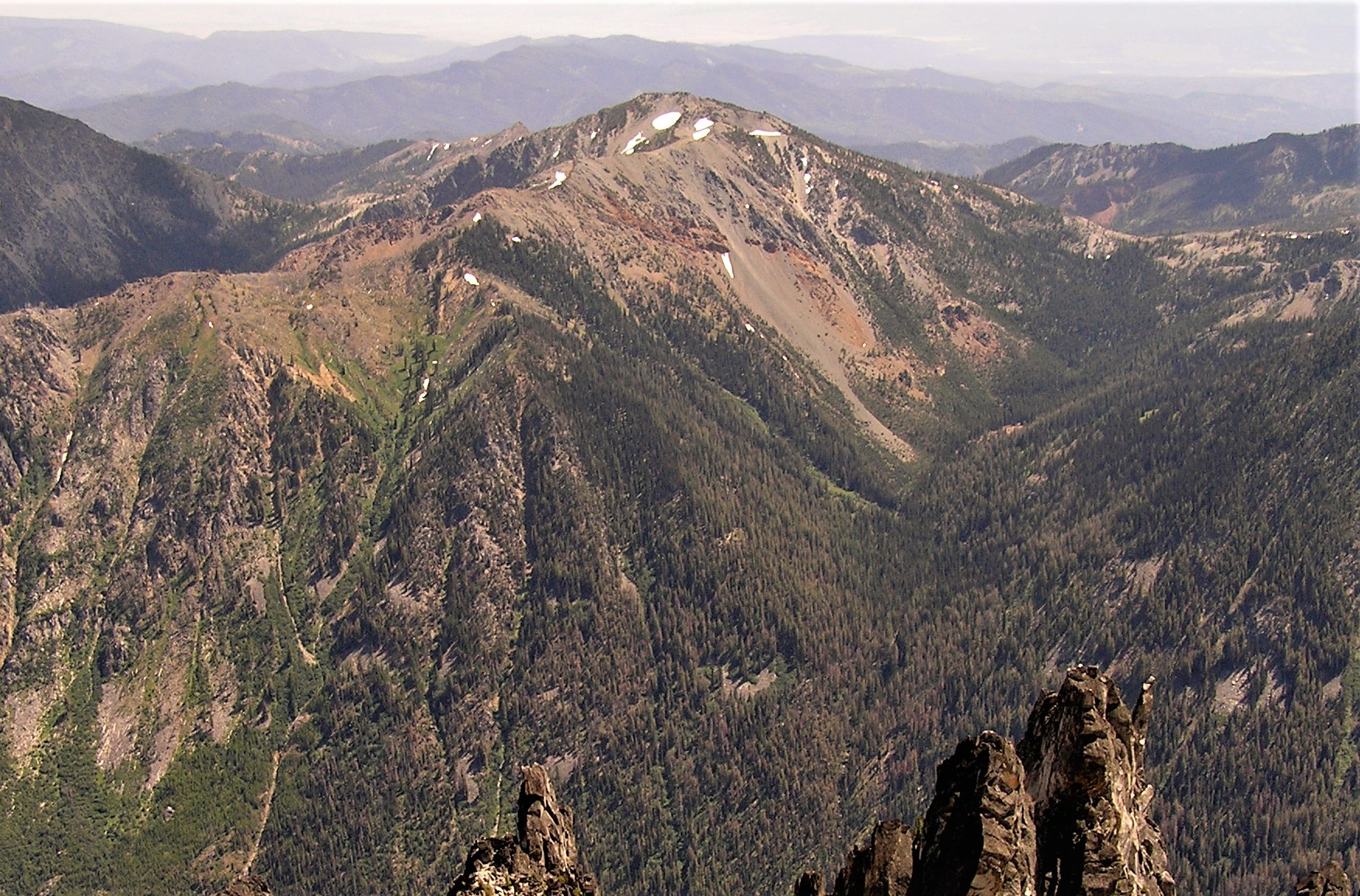
Navaho Peak seen from Little Annapurna
