= Teanaway Peak =

Mountain in Washington (state), United States

- Genes Peak
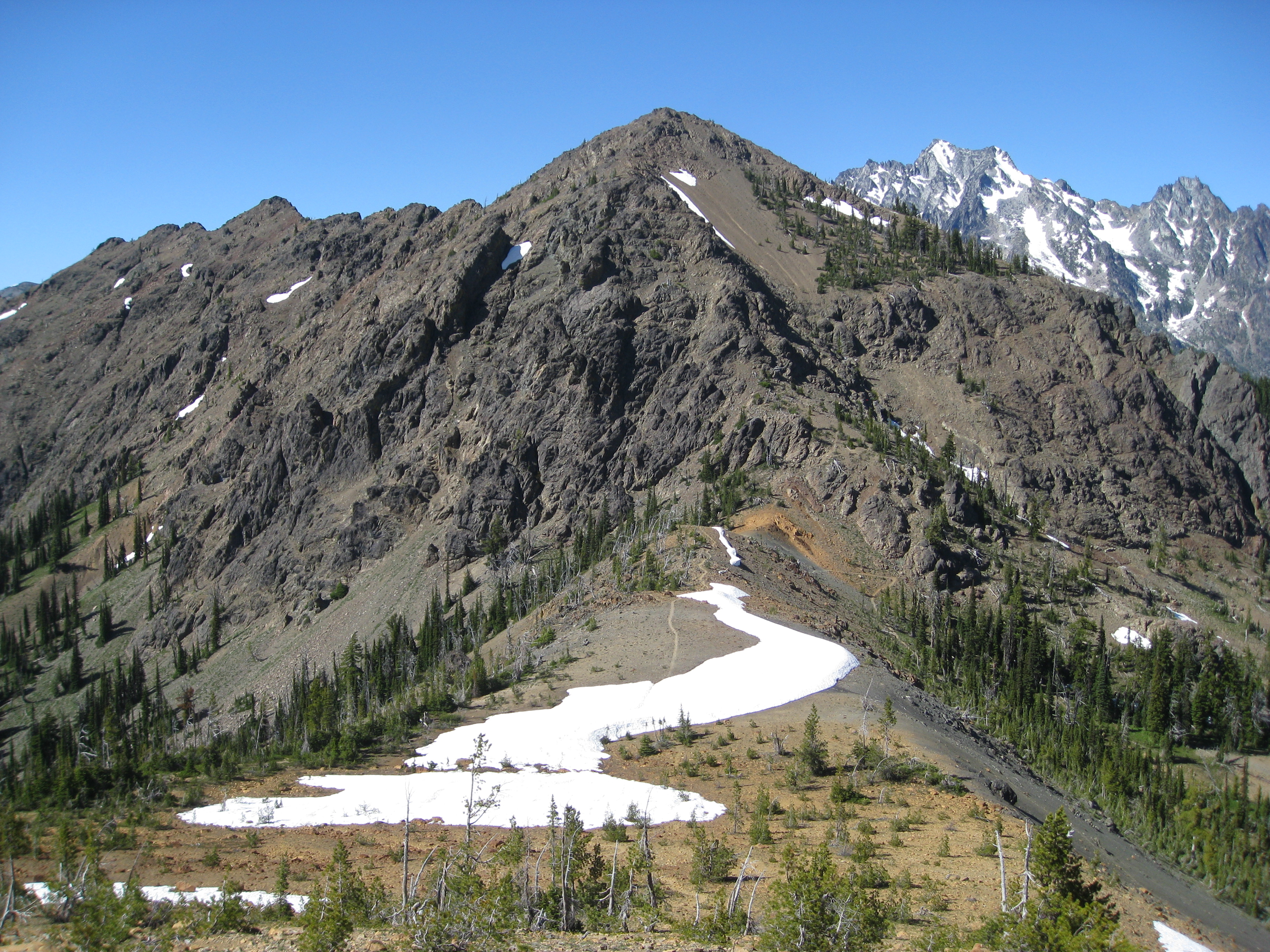
- South aspect, from Iron Peak

Highest point
- Elevation: 6,779 ft (2,066 m)
- Prominence: 539 ft (164 m)
- Parent peak: Bills Peak (6,917 ft)
- Isolation: 0.72 mi (1.16 km)
- Coordinates: 47°25′31″N 120°54′25″W

Geography
- Location within Washington (state) Location within the United States
- Location: Kittitas County / Chelan County; Washington, U.S.
- Parent range: Wenatchee Mountains; Cascade Range
- Topo map: USGS Mount Stuart

Geology
- Rock type: Serpentinite

Climbing
- Easiest route: class 2 scrambling

Teanaway Peak is a 6,779-foot (2,066-metre) mountain summit located in the Wenatchee Mountains, on the shared border of Kittitas County with Chelan County in Washington state. It is situated on the boundary of the Alpine Lakes Wilderness, on land managed by Wenatchee National Forest. Its nearest higher neighbor is Bills Peak, 0.72 mi (1.16 km) to the east. Precipitation runoff from the peak drains south into tributaries of the Teanaway River, or north into Turnpike Creek which is part of the Wenatchee River drainage basin. The view from the summit of this peak showcases the impressive Mount Stuart and Stuart Range for those who climb it. This peak also goes by the name "Genes Peak", which is for Gene Prater (1929–1993), the younger brother of Bill Prater, for whom Bills Peak was named. Gene was co-inventor of the modern aluminum snowshoe, and author of the seminal book, "Snowshoeing: From Novice to Master." Gene is also credited with first ascents of Sherpa Peak, Colchuck Balanced Rock, and the east summit of Ingalls Peak.

== Climate ==
Lying east of the Cascade crest, the area around Teanaway Peak is a bit drier than areas to the west. Summers can bring warm temperatures and occasional thunderstorms. Most weather fronts originate in the Pacific Ocean, and travel east toward the Cascade Mountains. As fronts approach, they are forced upward by the peaks of the Cascade Range, causing them to drop their moisture in the form of rain or snowfall onto the Cascades (Orographic lift). As a result, the eastern slopes of the Cascades experience lower precipitation than the western slopes. During winter months, weather is usually cloudy, but, due to high pressure systems over the Pacific Ocean that intensify during summer months, there is often little or no cloud cover during the summer.

== Geology ==
The Alpine Lakes Wilderness features some of the most rugged topography in the Cascade Range with craggy peaks and ridges, deep glacial valleys, and granite walls spotted with over 700 mountain lakes. Geological events occurring many years ago created the diverse topography and drastic elevation changes over the Cascade Range leading to the various climate differences.

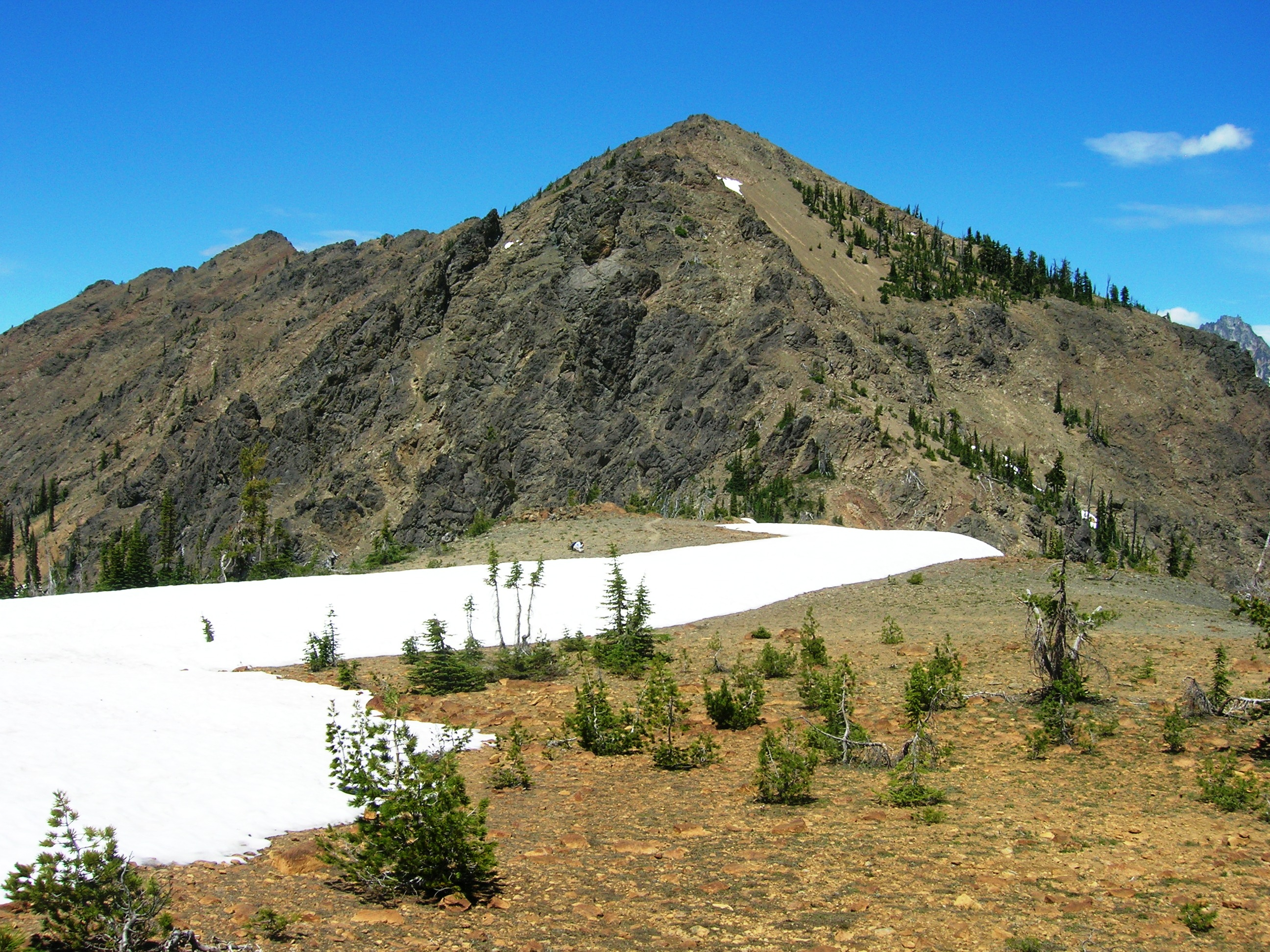
"Gene's Peak"

The history of the formation of the Cascade Mountains dates back millions of years ago to the late Eocene Epoch. With the North American Plate overriding the Pacific Plate, episodes of volcanic igneous activity persisted. In addition, small fragments of the oceanic and continental lithosphere called terranes created the North Cascades about 50 million years ago.

During the Pleistocene period dating back over two million years ago, glaciation advancing and retreating repeatedly scoured and shaped the landscape. The last glacial retreat in the Alpine Lakes area began about 14,000 years ago and was north of the Canada–US border by 10,000 years ago. The U-shaped cross section of the river valleys is a result of that recent glaciation. Uplift and faulting in combination with glaciation have been the dominant processes which have created the tall peaks and deep valleys of the Alpine Lakes Wilderness area.

== See also ==
- Geology of the Pacific Northwest
- List of peaks of the Alpine Lakes Wilderness
