= Earl Peak =

Mountain in Washington (state), United States

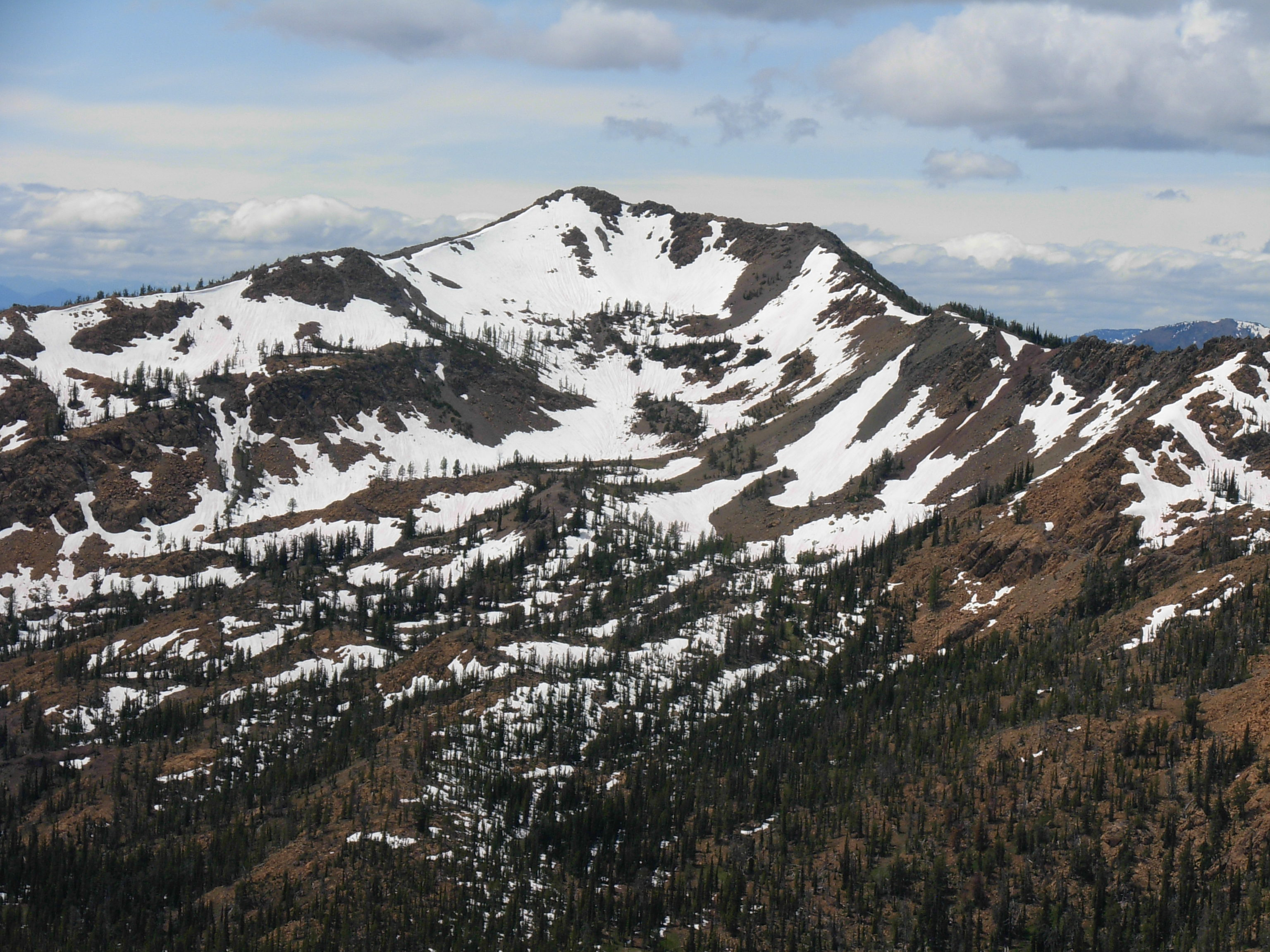
- Earl Peak, east aspect

Highest point
- Elevation: 7,036 ft (2,145 m)
- Prominence: 956 ft (291 m)
- Parent peak: Navaho Peak (7,223 ft)
- Isolation: 2.05 mi (3.30 km)
- Coordinates: 47°24′36″N 120°50′34″W

Geography
- Location within Washington (state) Location within the United States
- Country: United States
- State: Washington
- County: Kittitas
- Parent range: Wenatchee Mountains; Cascade Range
- Topo map: USGS Enchantment Lakes

Geology
- Rock age: Jurassic

Climbing
- Easiest route: class 2 scrambling

Earl Peak is a 7,036-foot (2,145-metre) mountain summit located on the edge of the Alpine Lakes Wilderness, in Kittitas County of Washington state. Earl Peak is the eighth-highest point in the Teanaway area of the Wenatchee Mountains. It is situated two miles southwest of Navaho Peak, on land managed by Wenatchee National Forest. Precipitation runoff from the peak drains south into tributaries of the Teanaway River, or north into Hardscrabble Creek which is part of the Wenatchee River drainage basin. The view from the summit of this peak showcases the impressive Mount Stuart and Stuart Range for those who climb it.

== Climate ==
Lying east of the Cascade crest, the area around Earl Peak is a bit drier than areas to the west. Summers can bring warm temperatures and occasional thunderstorms. Weather fronts originating in the Pacific Ocean travel east toward the Cascade Mountains. As fronts approach, they are forced upward by the peaks of the Cascade Range, causing them to drop their moisture in the form of rain or snow onto the Cascades (Orographic lift). As a result, the eastern slopes of the Cascades experience lower precipitation than the western slopes. During winter months, weather is usually cloudy, but due to high pressure systems over the Pacific Ocean that intensify during summer months, there is often little or no cloud cover during the summer.

== See also ==
- Geology of the Pacific Northwest

== Gallery ==
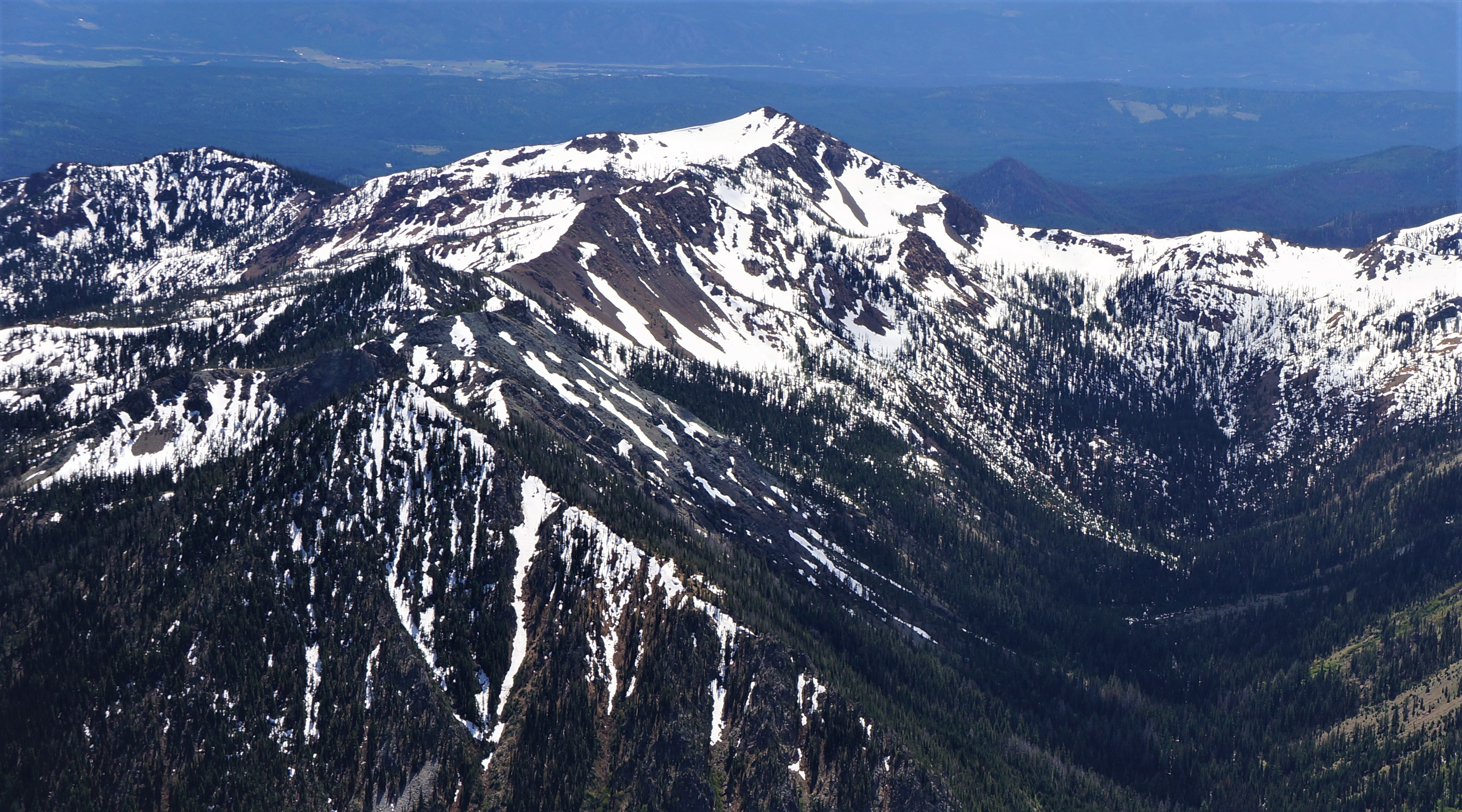
Earl Peak from Little Annapurna

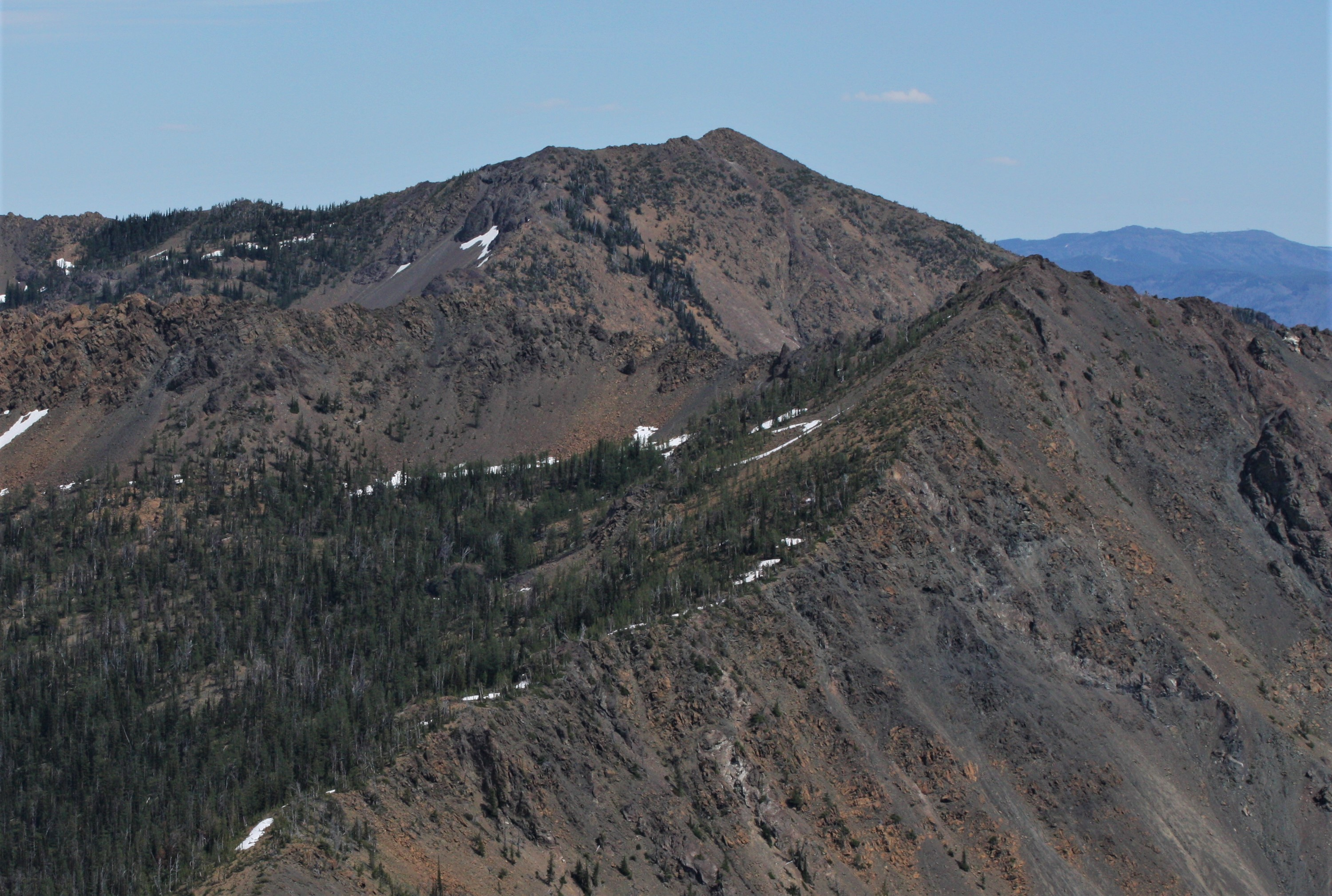
From west-northwest

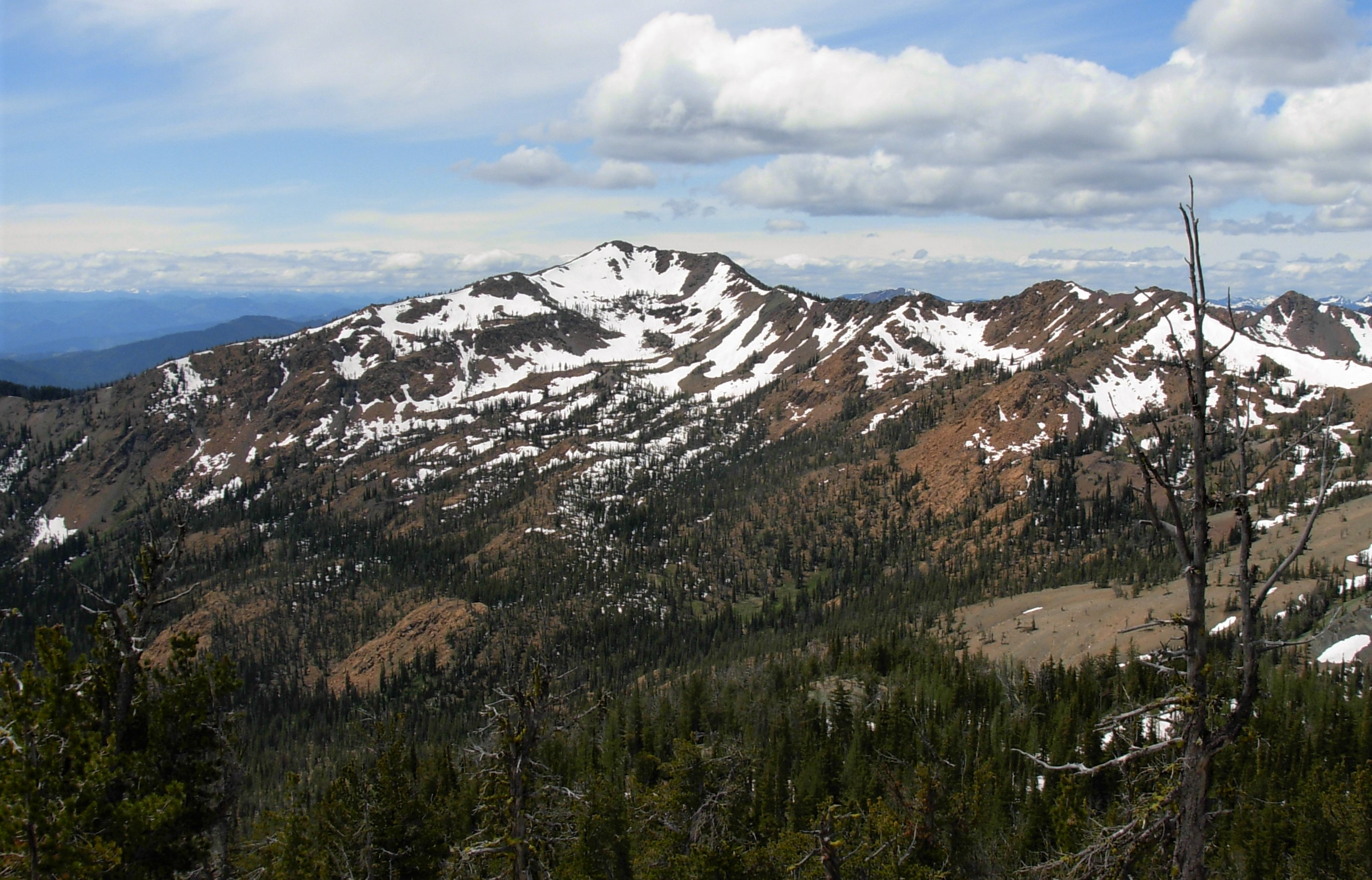
Earl Peak from near Navaho Peak

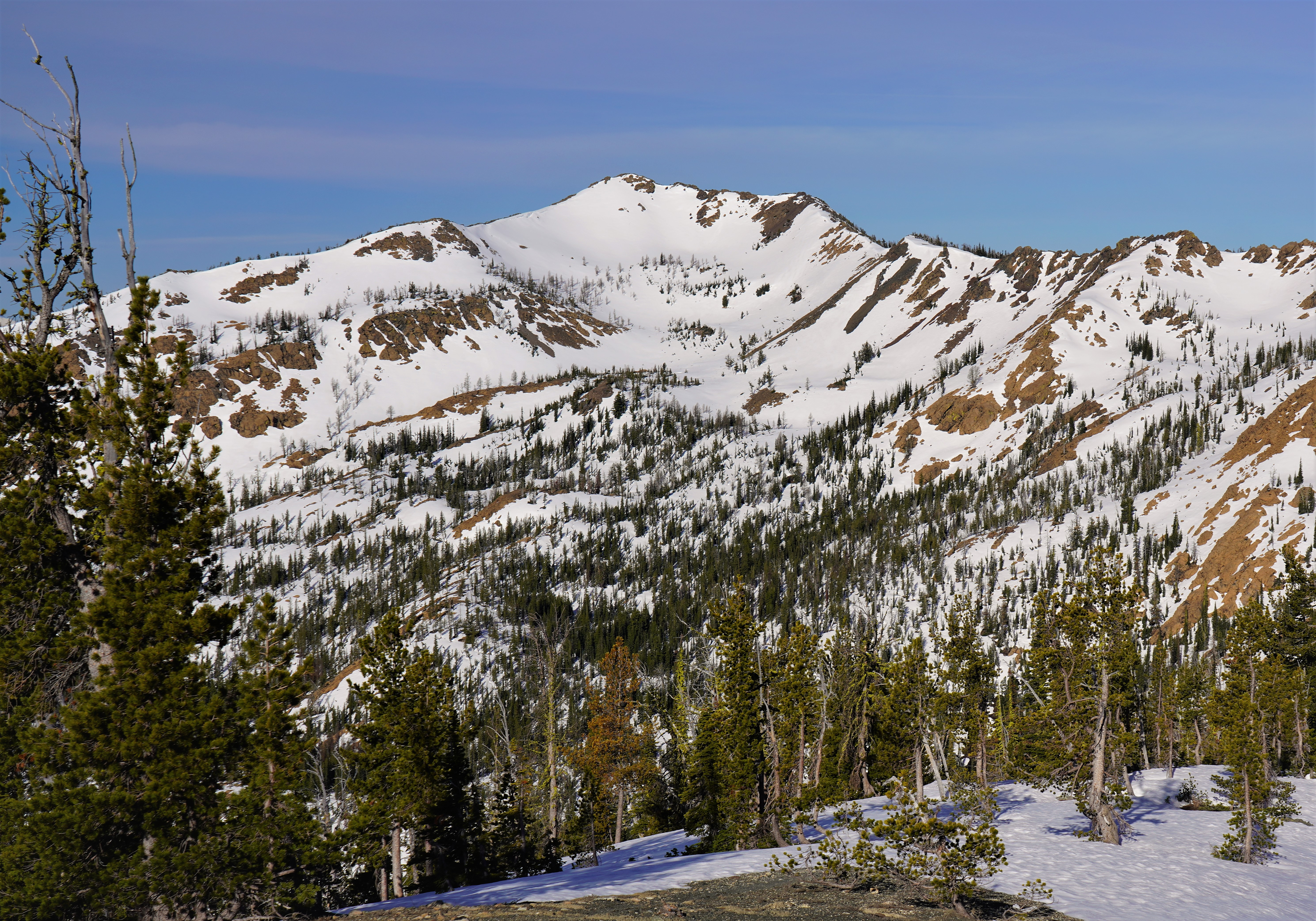
East aspect
