= List of lakes of the Alpine Lakes Wilderness =

The Alpine Lakes Wilderness is a large wilderness area in the North Cascades mountain range, located in northern Washington state, the Northwestern United States. Lakes in the Alpine Lakes Wilderness are protected within the Wenatchee National Forest or Mount Baker-Snoqualmie National Forest. A list of notable lakes in the Alpine Lakes Wilderness is shown, below.

== Lakes ==
Lake	Topo Map
Alaska Lake	Alaska Mountain
Alturas Lake	Bald Eagle Peak
Anderson Lake	Dog Mountain
Angeline Lake	Otter-Angeline
Avalanche Lake	Burnt Boot Peak
Azure Lake	Iron Cap Mountain
Azurite Lake	Otter-Angeline
Baker Lake	Keechelus Ridge
Bald Eagle Lake	Bald Eagle Peak
Bear Lake	Mile High
Bear Lakes	Canoe Peak
Bench Lake	Bare Mountain
Big Heart Lake	Angeline-Heart
Big Jim Mountain Lakes	Big Jim Mountain
Big Snow Lake	Big Snow Mountain
Blazer Lake	Mt. Defiance
Bobs Lake	French Ridge
Bonnie Lake	Otter BM
Chain Lakes	Sasha Peak
Chetwoot Lake	Iron Cap Mountain
Chikamin Lake	Chikamin Peak
Chiwaukum Lake	Chiwaukum Mountains
Colchuck Lake	Mt Stuart
Coney Lake	Cannon Mountain
Coney Lake	Lennox Mountain
Crawford Lake	Iron Cap Mountain
Deer Lake	Mile High
Delta Lake	Cockle Mountain
Dream Lake	Mile High
Edds Lake	Huckleberry Mountain
Eightmile Lake	Axis Peak
Emerald Lake	Moonstone Mountain
Enchantment Lakes	Enchantment Peaks
Foehn Lake	Otter BM
Fools Gold Lake	Big Snow Mountain
Glacier Lake	Chikamin Peak
Glacier Lake	Spark Plug Mountain
Gold Lake	Wild Goat Peak
Gravel Lake	Mount Thomson
Iron Cap Lake	Iron Cap Mountain
Island Lakes	Mt. Defiance
Jade Lake	Lynch Peak
Jade Lake	Moonstone Mountain
Joe Lake	Huckleberry Mountain
Josephine Lake	Lumiere Ridge
Judy Lake	Floating Rock
Klonaqua Lakes	French Ridge
Lake Alice	Cape Horn
Lake Augusta	Big Jim Mountain
Lake Donald	Chiwaukum Mountains
Lake Dorothy	Toto Peak
Lake Edna	Cape Horn
Lake Ethel	Chiwaukum Mountains
Lake Ida	Icicle Ridge
Lake Iiswoot	Moonstone Mountain
Lake Ingalls	Ingalls Peak South
Lake Julius	Chiwaukum Mountains
Lake Kanim	Lennox Mountain
Lake Laura	Rampart Ridge
Lake Lillian	Rampart Ridge
Lake Rowena	Bears Breast Mountain
Lake Serene	Mt Index Middle Peak
Lake Sylvester	Grindstone Mountain
Lila Lake	Alta Mountain
Loch Eileen	Chiwaukum Mountains
Loch Katrine	Twin Peaks South
Lower Florence Lake	Ladies Peak
Margaret Lake	Mt Margaret
Marlene Lake	Little Bulger
Marten Lake	Dog Mountain
Mason Lake	Mt. Defiance
Melakwa Lake	Chair Peak
Milk Lake	Mac Peak
Moira Lake	Little Bulger
Murphy Lakes	K9
Myrtle Lake	Little Bulger
Nada Lake	Three Musketeers Ridge
Olallie Lake	Pratt Mountain
Opal Lake	Goat Mountain
Otter Lake	Otter BM
Paradise Lakes	Bare Mountain
Pete Lake	Island Mountain
Pratt Lake	Pratt Mountain
Rachel Lake	Rampart Ridge
Rainbow Lake	Mt. Defiance
Rampart Lakes	Rampart Ridge
Shield Lake	Enchantment Peaks
Snoqualmie Lake	Little Bulger
Snoqualmie Lake Potholes	Little Bulger
Snow Lake	Chair Peak
Snow Lakes	The Temple
Spectacle Lake	Chikamin Peak
Stonesthrow Lake	Mt Margaret
Summit Lake	Cowboy Mountain
Sunday Lake	Big Kid
Talapus Lake	Pratt Mountain
Upper Florence Lake	Ladies Peak
Upper Melakwa Lake	Chair Peak
Waptus Lake	The Citadel

== See also ==
- List of peaks in the Alpine Lakes Wilderness
- Ecology of the North Cascades
- Geography of the North Cascades
- List of waterfalls of Washington
