= Lake Lillian (Washington) =

Lake in Washington, United States

- Location within Washington (state) Location within the United States
- Location: Kittitas County, Washington, United States
- Coordinates: 47.4007°N 121.3403°W
- Primary outflows: Rocky Run Creek
- Basin countries: United States
- Surface area: 12.5 acres (0.051 km^{2})
- Surface elevation: 4,783 ft (1,458 m)

Lake Lillian is a freshwater lake located within the Alpine Lakes Wilderness in a valley on the southern slope of Rampart Ridge in Kittitas County, Washington, United States. Because of its close proximity to Snoqualmie Pass, Interstate 90 and several cirque on both sides of Rampart Ridge, the lake is a common area for hiking, swimming, and fishing rainbow trout. Rocky Run Creek outflows from Lake Lillian into neighboring Lake Laura and continues toward NF road 136 on Rampart Ridge Backdoor. Lake Lillian is between Keechelus Lake on the West and Kachess Lake further East.

== Location ==
Lake Lillian sits on the eastern aspect of the meadow valley it shares with Lake Laura on the eastern skirt of the southern aspect of Rampart Ridge. Twin Lakes and Lake Margaret are a short distance southeast, while Gold Lake is further north.

Access to Lake Lillian is through Lake Lillian Trail #1332, which starts at a trailhead for Mt Margaret and Lake Lillian off National Forest Development Road 4934. The trail goes through tree plantations and old-growth forests until it reaches the slopes and ridge of Mt Margaret, where it branches off as Lake Margaret Trail #1332.1. The parking at Lake Lillian Trail is adequate for 20 vehicles. The trailhead is approximately half mile from the start of Rd 4934 off of Forest Road 4832. The trail down the ridge towards Lake Lillian first crosses Lake Yvonne. Lake Lillian is in a meadow area past Margaret Lake and Twin Lakes down a mountain slope.

== See also ==
- List of lakes of the Alpine Lakes Wilderness
