= Lake Julius (Washington) =

Lake in Washington, United States

- Location within Washington (state) Location within the United States
- Location: Kittitas County, Washington, United States
- Coordinates: 47.7364544°N 120.8760845°W
- Primary outflows: Roarking Creek
- Basin countries: United States
- Surface area: 13.3 acres (0.054 km^{2})
- Surface elevation: 5,194 ft (1,583 m)

Lake Julius is a freshwater lakes located on the north slope of the Chiwaukum Mountains, in Chelan County, Washington. Self-issued Alpine Lake Wilderness permit required for transit within the Klonaqua Lakes area. The lake is a popular area for hiking, swimming, and fishing Cutthroat trout.

== Location ==
Julius Lake is accessed from Upper Roaring Creek Trail #1584, a spinoff of Lake Ethel Trail #1585. The Lake Ethel trailhead is located 2.5 miles south on Gill Creek Road #6940 off of U.S. Highway 2 in the community of Merritt.

== Geography ==
Lake Julius sits on a highly glaciated and semibarren alpine basin, surrounded by heather and other wildflowers and a coniferous presence primarily larch pines.

== History ==
Lake Julius is one of the Scottish Lakes, which includes nearby Lake Donald, Loch Eileen and Lake Ethel. The lakes were given names by Albert Hale Sylvester, a topographer for the United States Geological Survey working throughout the North Cascades National Park Complex around 1900, named after female family and friends of Sylvester. Lake Julius was named by Sylvester after one of his companions from the Forest Service, Julius Kummel.

== See also ==
- List of lakes of the Alpine Lakes Wilderness
