= Lake Iiswoot =

Freshwater lake in Washington, United States

- Location within Washington (state) Location within the United States
- Location: King County, Washington, United States
- Coordinates: 47.5846°N 121.2510°W
- Basin countries: United States
- Surface area: 43 acres (0.17 km^{2})
- Surface elevation: 4,593 ft (1,400 m)

Lake Iiswoot is a freshwater lake located on the western region of the Alpine Lakes Wilderness, in King County, Washington. It is located on the eastern slope of Necklace Valley. Lake Iiswoot and its surrounding lakes and peaks is a popular area for hiking, swimming, and fishing. Self-issued Alpine Lake Wilderness permit required for transit within the Necklace Valley area.

== History ==
Lake Iiswoot borders at close proximity to the Necklace Valley Lakes, which includes nearby Jade Lake and Emerald Lake. The name of the lake is from the Chinook Jargon root itswoot, meaning "Black Bear". Other prominent areas lie at short distance from Iiswoot, South is La Bohn Lakes and east is Hinman Glacier in the border between King and Kittitas County.

== See also ==
- List of lakes of the Alpine Lakes Wilderness
