= Lake Laura =

Lake in Washington, United States

Lillian Laura
- Location within Washington (state) Location within the United States
- Location: Kittitas County, Washington, United States
- Coordinates: 47.3981°N 121.34343°W
- Primary outflows: Rocky Run Creek
- Basin countries: United States
- Surface area: 3.2 acres (0.013 km^{2})
- Surface elevation: 4,783 ft (1,458 m)

Lake Laura is a small freshwater lake located within the Alpine Lakes Wilderness in a valley on the southern slope of Rampart Ridge in Kittitas County, Washington, United States. Because of its close proximity to Snoqualmie Pass, Interstate 90 and several cirque on both sides of Rampart Ridge, the lake is a common area for hiking, swimming, and fishing rainbow trout. Rocky Run Creek outflows from Lake Lillian and outflows Lake Laura along NF road 136 on Rampart Ridge Backdoor toward neighboring Keechelus Lake.

== Location ==
Laura Lake sits on the eastern aspect of the meadow valley it shares with Lillian Lake on the eastern skirt of the southern aspect of Rampart Ridge. Twin Lakes and Margaret Lake are a short distance southeast, while Gold Lake is further north.

Access to Laura Lake is through Lake Lillian Trail #1332, which starts at a trailhead for Mt Margaret and Lake Lillian off National Forest Development Road 4934.

== See also ==
- List of lakes of the Alpine Lakes Wilderness
