= Lake Ingalls =

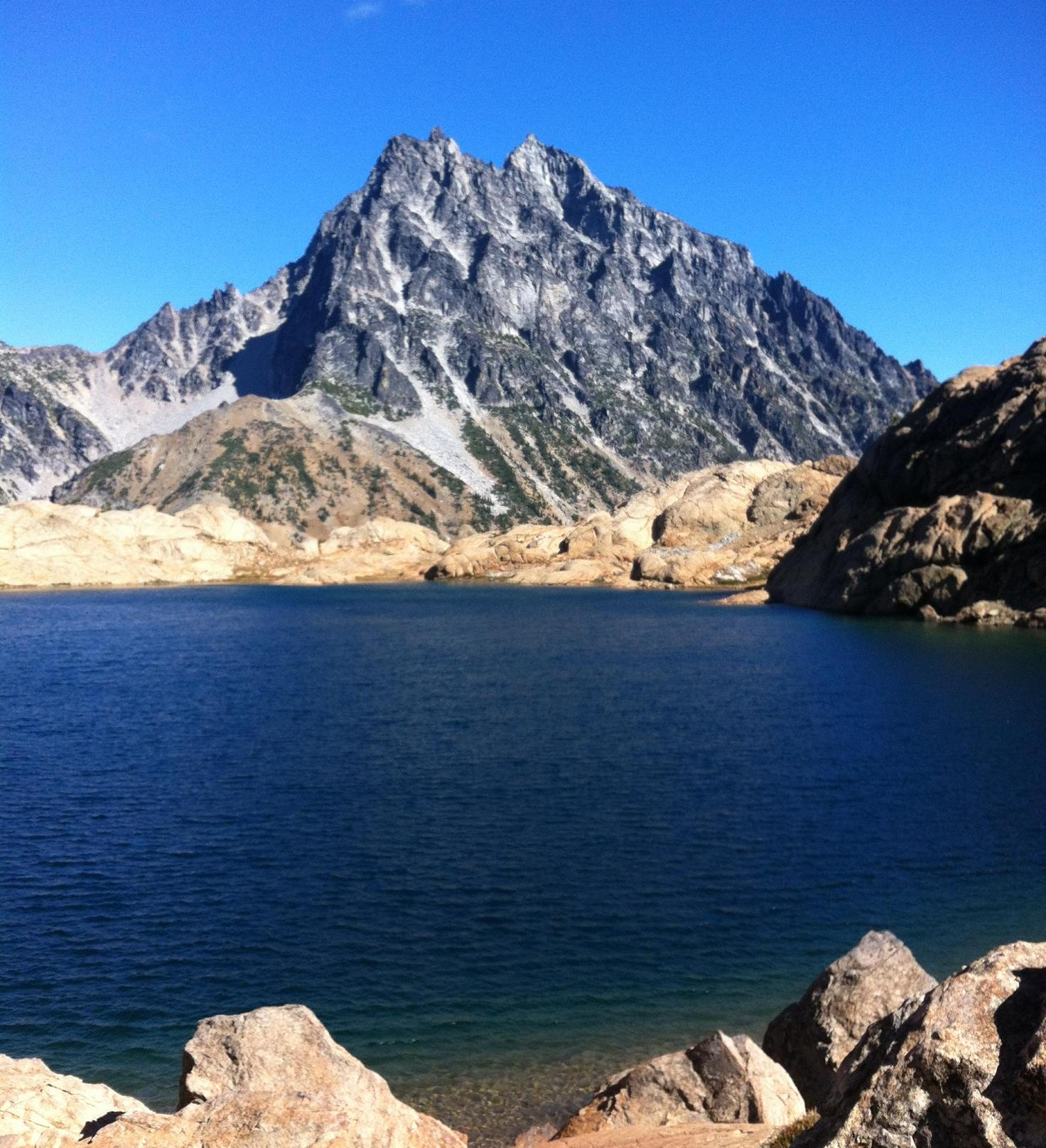
- Lake Ingalls looking toward Mount Stuart.

- Location within Washington (state) Location within the United States
- Location: Chelan County, Washington
- Coordinates: 47°28′13″N 120°56′19″W
- Type: Glacial lake
- Primary outflows: Ingalls Creek
- Basin countries: United States
- Surface elevation: 6,466 ft (1,971 m)
- Islands: 0

Lake Ingalls is a glacial lake located in Chelan County, Washington and in the Alpine Lakes Wilderness. The lake is a popular area for hiking and offers excellent views of nearby Mount Stuart.

It is accessed by a 9 mile hike roundtrip

The lake drains into Ingalls Creek, which belongs to the Wenatchee River basin. The lake, the creek, the nearby pass which the trail crosses, and the nearby peak are named after Captain Benjamin Ingalls, who explored the local area

== See also ==
- Mount Stuart
- List of lakes of the Alpine Lakes Wilderness
