= Opal Lake =

Lake in Washington, United States

- Location within Washington (state) Location within the United States
- Location: King County, Washington, United States
- Coordinates: 47.5750838°N 121.2517503°W
- Basin countries: United States
- Surface area: 1 acre (0.0040 km^{2})
- Surface elevation: 4,790 ft (1,460 m)

Opal Lake, also known as Necklace Valley Lake 3, is a freshwater lake located on the western region of the Alpine Lakes Wilderness, in King County, Washington. The lake is connected by stream to Emerald Lake and Jade Lake, which form together the Neckelace Valley Lakes. Opal Lake and its surrounding lakes and peaks are a popular area for hiking, swimming, and fishing Rainbow trout. Self-issued Alpine Lake Wilderness permit required for transit within the Necklace Valley area.

== History ==
Opal Lake is one of the Necklace Valley Lakes, which includes nearby Jade Lake and Emerald Lake. The lakes form a topographic sequence that reminds of a necklace, hence the name makes reference to a necklace strung with streams in between. The Necklace Valley was the site of mining, camping sites on Opal Lake and surrounding sites still contain mining instruments and remnants of mining activity.

== Location ==
Access to Opal Lake and other Necklace Valley Lakes is through Necklace Valley Trail #1062. The trailhead is approximately 4.5 miles into Forest Road 68, east of the Skykomish Ranger Station. The trail mostly follows the East Fork Foss River until it reaches the granite slopes of Necklace Valley. The trail is approximately 9 miles until it ends in Opal Lake by interruption from massive shattered granite boulders, calved off the sheer granite cliffs at the base of the valley. In between the granite cliffs, each lake connects to the next by small meadows where camping sites are located.

== See also ==
- List of lakes of the Alpine Lakes Wilderness
