= Loch Katrine (Washington) =

Lake in the Alpine Lakes Wilderness, Washington, United States

Coordinates: 47°38′12.27″N 121°36′21.88″W

Loch Katrine is a lake at 885 meters (2,904 ft) above sea level in the Cascade Range, in King County, Washington (state) state. It is one of the many lakes of the Alpine Lakes Wilderness. The lake contains a small island near its outlet.
