= Eightmile Mountain =

Mountain in Washington (state), United States

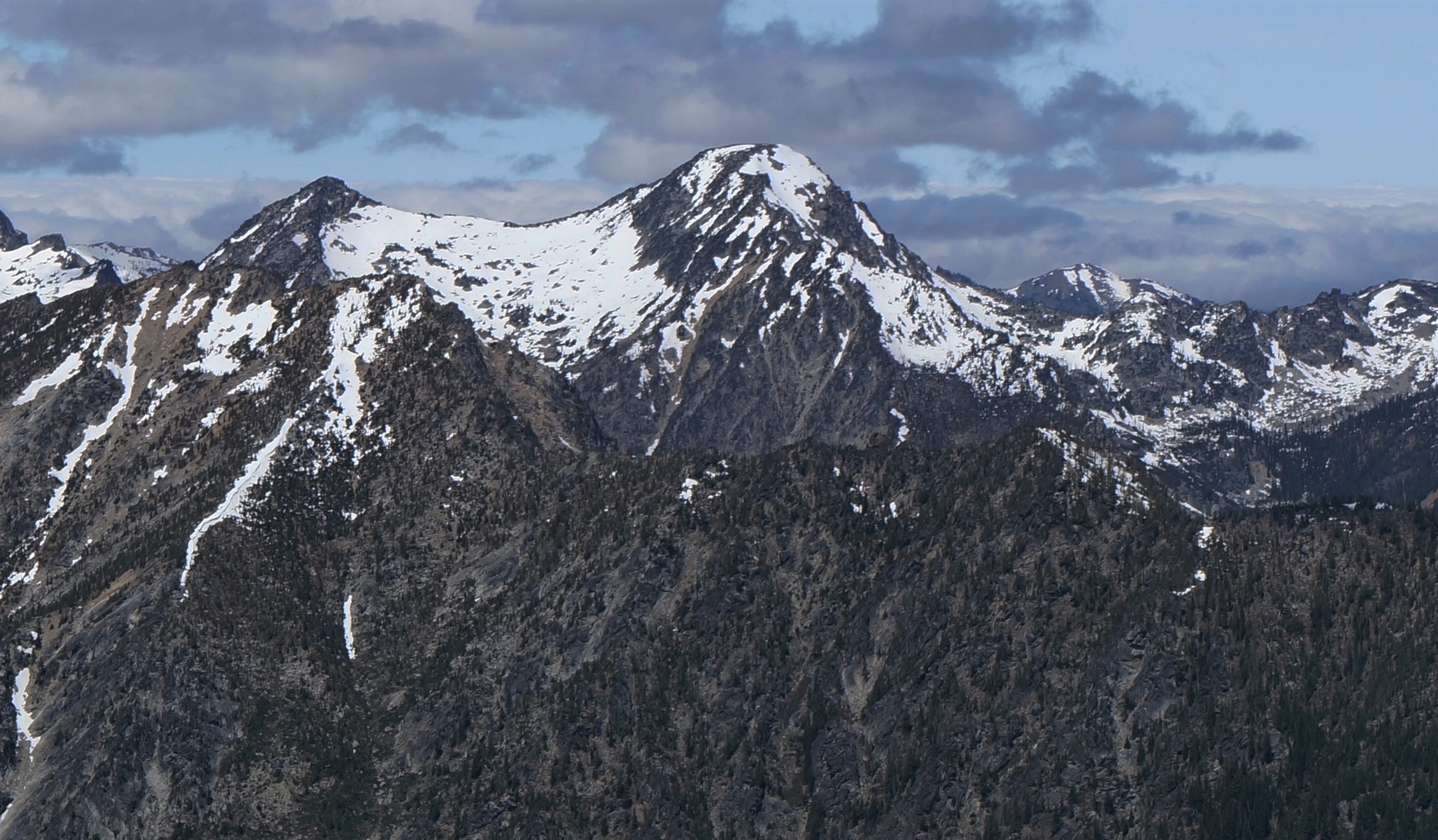
- Southeast aspect, from Aasgard Pass

Highest point
- Elevation: 7,996 ft (2,437 m)
- Prominence: 956 ft (291 m)
- Parent peak: Cashmere Mountain
- Isolation: 2.97 mi (4.78 km)
- Coordinates: 47°31′56″N 120°53′51″W

Geography
- Location within Washington (state) Location within the United States
- Country: United States
- State: Washington
- County: Chelan
- Protected area: Alpine Lakes Wilderness
- Parent range: Cascade Range
- Topo map: USGS Jack Ridge

Geology
- Rock age: Late Cretaceous
- Rock type: Tonalitic plutons

Climbing
- Easiest route: class 2 Hiking

Eightmile Mountain is a 7,996-foot (2,437-metre) mountain summit located in Chelan County of Washington state. Eightmile Mountain is situated within the Alpine Lakes Wilderness, on land managed by the Okanogan–Wenatchee National Forest. It is part of the Wenatchee Mountains which are a subset of the Cascade Range. Its nearest higher neighbor is Cashmere Mountain, 3 mi (4.8 km) to the northeast, and Mount Stuart rises 4 mi (6.4 km) to the south. Precipitation runoff from the mountain drains into Trout Creek and Eightmile Creek, both tributaries of Icicle Creek, which in turn is a tributary of the Wenatchee River. This mountain is known for its spring skiing and excellent view of the Stuart Range.

== Climate ==
Weather fronts originating in the Pacific Ocean travel east toward the Cascade Mountains. As fronts approach, they are forced upward by the peaks of the Cascade Range, causing them to drop their moisture in the form of rain or snowfall onto the Cascades (Orographic lift). As a result, the Cascades experience high precipitation, especially during the winter months in the form of snowfall. During winter months, weather is usually cloudy, but due to high pressure systems over the Pacific Ocean that intensify during summer months, there is often little or no cloud cover during the summer.

== Geology ==
The Alpine Lakes Wilderness features some of the most rugged topography in the Cascade Range with craggy peaks and ridges, deep glacial valleys, and granite walls spotted with over 700 mountain lakes. Geological events occurring many years ago created the diverse topography and drastic elevation changes over the Cascade Range leading to the various climate differences.

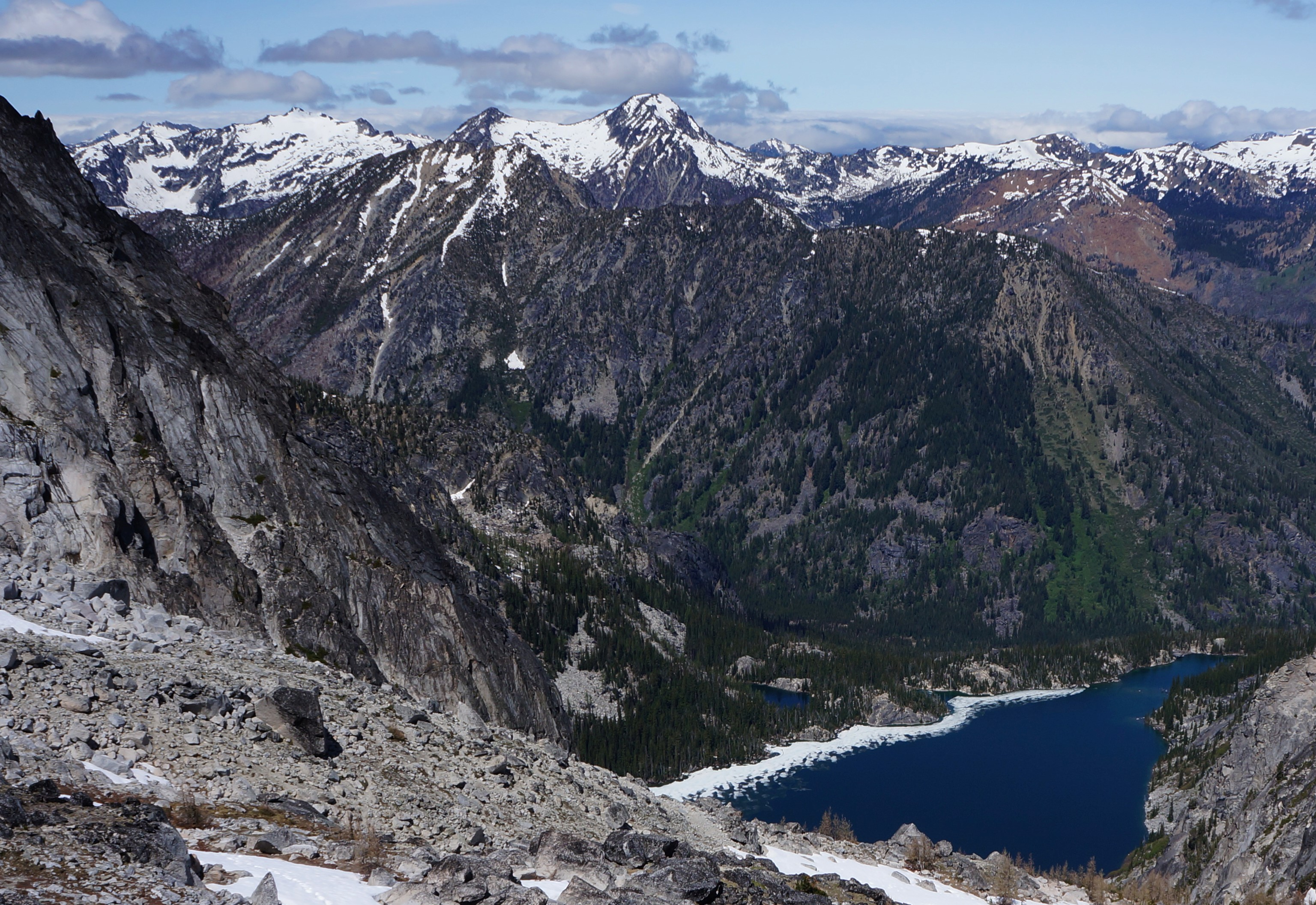
Eightmile Mountain and Colchuck Lake from the top of Aasgard Pass

The history of the formation of the Cascade Mountains dates back millions of years ago to the late Eocene Epoch. With the North American Plate overriding the Pacific Plate, episodes of volcanic igneous activity persisted. In addition, small fragments of the oceanic and continental lithosphere called terranes created the North Cascades about 50 million years ago.

During the Pleistocene period dating back over two million years ago, glaciation advancing and retreating repeatedly scoured the landscape leaving deposits of rock debris. The last glacial retreat in the Alpine Lakes area began about 14,000 years ago and was north of the Canada–US border by 10,000 years ago. The U-shaped cross section of the river valleys is a result of that recent glaciation. Uplift and faulting in combination with glaciation have been the dominant processes which have created the tall peaks and deep valleys of the Alpine Lakes Wilderness area.

== See also ==
- List of peaks of the Alpine Lakes Wilderness
- Geology of the Pacific Northwest
