= Klonaqua Lakes =

Lakes in Washington, United States

Klonaqua Lake
- Location within Washington (state) Location within the United States
- Location: Chelan County, Washington, United States
- Coordinates: 47.5945552°N 121.0696165°W
- Basin countries: United States
- Surface area: 66 acres (0.27 km^{2})
- Surface elevation: 5,095 ft (1,553 m)

Klonaqua Lakes are a set of freshwater reservoir lakes located on the western slope of The Enchantments, in Chelan County, Washington. A self-issued Alpine Lake Wilderness permit is required for transit within the Klonaqua Lakes area.

== Name ==
Along with neighboring lakes, Klonaqua Lakes was given its name by Albert Hale Sylvester, a topographer for the United States Geological Survey working throughout the North Cascades National Park Complex in the 1900s. Sylvester compounded the word from the Chinook Jargon klone with the Wenatchi language word aqua to mean three waters.

== History ==
Archaeological surveying in the area of the Snow Lakes shows evidence that the occupation of indigenous groups dated to at least 12,000 years before the present era. Klonaqua Lake is within the traditional territory of the Wenatchi People, one of the Confederated Tribes of the Colville Reservation and within the ceded lands of the Yakama Nation.

Icicle Irrigation District applied in 1926 for the right to divert water from Klonaqua Lakes at approximately 25 cfs (cubic feet per second) for seasonal irrigation purposes. The State Supervisor of Hydraulics issued Permit Number 828 in January 1927 for the requested amount. The irrigation district also sought permission to raise the lake levels because of inadequate summer flows for irrigation. The Department of Public Lands approved this request in an October 1927 order that allowed the irrigation district to inundate lakeshores on the lake.

== Geography ==
Klonaqua Lake sits in a basin consisting of rocky soils and igneous tonalite geology. The bedrock is about 3 feet from the surface and mapped as granites of the Mount Stuart Batholith (Mesozoic intrusive rocks) and ultramafic/metamorphic of the Ingalls Tectonic Complex (Mesozoic-Paleozoic ultramafic rocks). The trail to the lake consists of sandy loam the first half and boulders added in the second half of the trajectory.

=== Climate ===
The Klonaqua lakes are within a hemiboreal climate. The average temperature is 0 °C. The warmest month is August, with an average temperature of 14 °C, and the coldest month is January, at an average of −11 °C. The average rainfall is 1,989 millimeters per year. The wettest month is December, with 265 millimeters of rain, and the least in July, with 39 millimeters of rain.

Klonaqua Lakes

Climate chart (precipitation, max. and min. temperature)
J	F	M	A	M	J	J	A	S	O	N	D
240 −9 −11	226 −6 −10	220 −4 −9	167 0 −8	134 6 −3	78 11 3	39 19 8	50 20 8	111 13 5	206 8 −2	253 −3 −8	265 −10 −12
- █ Average max. and min. temperatures in °C
- █ Precipitation totals in mm
Imperial conversion
J	F	M	A	M	J	J	A	S	O	N	D
9.4 16 12	8.9 21 14	8.7 25 16	6.6 32 18	5.3 43 27	3.1 52 37	1.5 66 46	2 68 46	4.4 55 41	8.1 46 28	10 27 18	10 14 10
- █ Average max. and min. temperatures in °F
- █ Precipitation totals in inches

== Uses ==
Klonaqua Lakes are managed by the Icicle and Peshastin Irrigation Districts (IPID) to provide water storage for irrigation. The lake captures water runoff at the far southeast of a 3,800-acre drainage basin which gives the lake a high potential for refill, even during dry years. Between Eightmile Lake, Colchuck Lake and Klonaqua Lake, the total average usable storage volume is 6,600 acre-feet. Additional usage storage volume of approximately 12,730 acre-feet is available from Snow Lakes.

Both reservoirs are contained by a small dam consisting of a rock and masonry structure with stop logs and an earthen embankment section that extends from the rock-masonry/concrete structure to the hillside north of the dam. The dam is fitted with a low-level outlet pipeline and a slide gate at the outlet of the lake. This infrastructure allows for controlled releases of stored water to supplement flows into an unnamed creek, which flows to French Creek, a tributary of Icicle Creek and increase the water supply available during low flow periods, which typically occur during the late summer.

== Access ==
Access to Klonaqua Lakes is through Klonaqua trail which spins off French Creek Trail. The trail ascends steeply and splits at Bobs Lake (5,197 feet (1,584 m)) in order to access both main lakes. Camping sites are dotted along Klonaqua Lakes. Bobs Lakes is also lined with campsites as overflow and is stocked with trout.

== 2017 fire ==
On August 11, 2017 lightning caused by a cold frontal passage that tracked through the Alpine Lakes Wilderness started a fire about 15 miles southwest of Leavenworth, Washington. The fire expanded into the Eightmile Lake, Stuart Lake and Klonaqua drainages burning to the shoreline and damaging a large percentage of the lake's watershed. The fire has caused a potential change in runoff into the lake.

== See also ==
- List of lakes of the Alpine Lakes Wilderness
