= Eightmile Lake =

Reservoir in Washington, United States

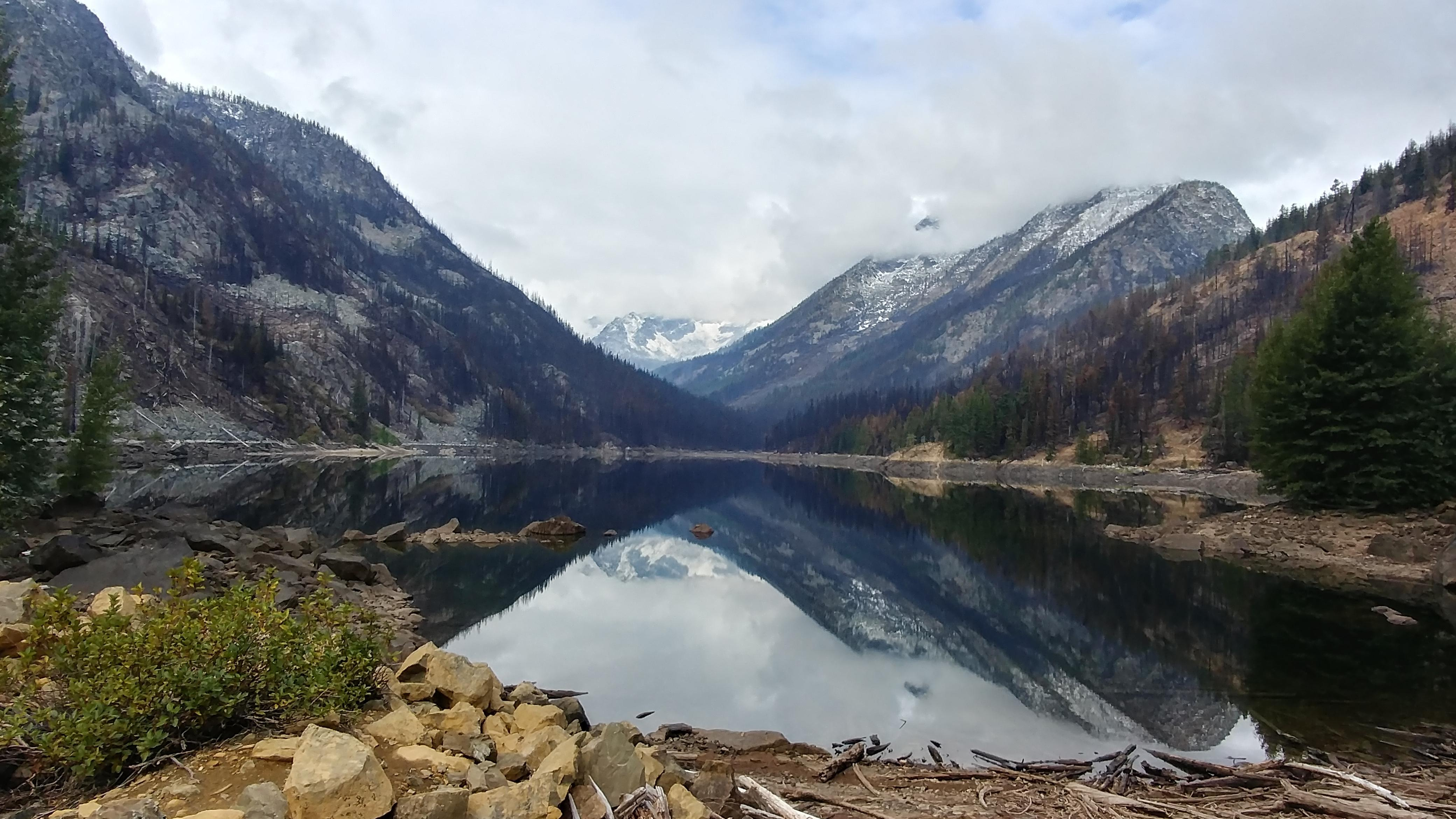
- Eightmile Lake Mosaic Burn

- Location within Washington (state) Location within the United States
- Location: Chelan County, Washington, United States
- Coordinates: 47°31′13.1″N 120°51′55.1″W
- Primary inflows: Eightmile creek
- Primary outflows: Eightmile creek
- Basin countries: United States
- Water volume: 76.6 acres (31.0 ha)
- Surface elevation: 4,641 ft (1,415 m)

Eightmile Lake is a reservoir lake located on the eastern slope of Eightmile Mountain, in Chelan County in Washington. It is a reservoir lake formed along the beginning route of Eightmile Creek as it exits Jack Ridge.

The lake is located approximately 10 miles from the city of Leavenworth, Washington. It is accessed by a 3.5-mile trail (USFS Trail No. 1552) that starts at USFS Road 7601 as it crosses over Eighmile Creek and makes a turn towards the Stuart and Culchuck Lake Trailhead where the road ends. Self-issued Alpine Lake Wilderness permit required for transit within the Eightmile Lake area.

== Geography ==
=== Geology ===
Eighmile lake sits in a basin consisting of rocky soils and igneous tonalite geology. The bedrock is about 3 feet from the surface. There is a large landslide area with boulders and other mass-wasting deposits located at the northeast shore of the lake. The trail to the lake consists of sandy loam and boulders. Eightmile Lake sits on a highly glaciated and semibarren alpine basin, surrounded by heather and other wildflowers and a coniferous presence primarily larch pines.

=== Climate ===
Eightmile lake has a hemiboreal climate. The average temperature is 2 °C. The warmest month is August, with an average temperature of 17 °C, and the coldest month is January, at an average of −10 °C. The average rainfall is 705 millimeters per year. The wettest month is December, with 111 millimeters of rain, and the least in July, with 16 millimeters of rain.

Eightmile Lake

Climate chart (precipitation, max. and min. temperature)
J	F	M	A	M	J	J	A	S	O	N	D
94 −8 −11	85 −6 −11	74 −2 −10	50 1 −7	30 8 −1	25 14 3	16 23 9	23 22 12	39 16 7	68 7 0	90 −4 −6	111 −8 −12
- █ Average max. and min. temperatures in °C
- █ Precipitation totals in mm
Imperial conversion
J	F	M	A	M	J	J	A	S	O	N	D
3.7 18 12	3.3 21 12	2.9 28 14	2 34 19	1.2 46 30	1 57 37	0.6 73 48	0.9 72 54	1.5 61 45	2.7 45 32	3.5 25 21	4.4 18 10
- █ Average max. and min. temperatures in °F
- █ Precipitation totals in inches

== Uses ==
Eightmile Lake is managed by the Icicle and Peshastin Irrigation Districts (IPID) to provide water storage for irrigation. The lake captures water runoff from a 3,800-acre drainage basin which gives the lake a high potential for refill, even during dry years. The reservoir is contained by a small dam consisting of a rock and masonry structure with stop logs and an earthen embankment section that extends from the rock-masonry/concrete structure to the hillside north of the dam. The dam is fitted with a low-level outlet pipeline and a slide gate at the outlet of the lake. Stop logs were first placed in a notch in the concrete portion of the dam up to the spillway crest to allow the lake to fill to an elevation of approximately 4,671 feet.

This infrastructure allows for controlled releases of stored water to supplement flows into Icicle Creek and increase the water supply available during low flow periods, which typically occur during the late summer.

== 2017 fire ==
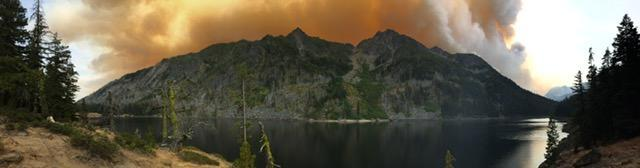
Jack Creek Forest Fire and Eightmile Lake

On August 11, 2017 lightning caused by a cold frontal passage that tracked through the Alpine Lakes Wilderness started a fire about 15 miles southwest of Leavenworth, Washington. The fire expanded into the Stuart Lake and Eightmile drainages burning to the shoreline of Eightmile Lake damaging a large percentage of the lake's watershed. The fire has caused a potential change in runoff into the lake.

== Restoration ==
In 2016, Chelan County and the Washington State Department of Ecology had proposed the Icicle Strategy plan to resolve the shortage of water supply that threatened irrigation, fish habitat and passage, and tribal and non-tribal fisheries in the Icicle Creek subbasin region. The plan also managed to improve streamflow and water availability into the subbasin affected by the subsequent 2017 forest fires. In 2018, the plan was approved by the Washington State Department of Ecology. The Icicle Strategy also restored the dam infrastructure at Eightmile Lake, permitting higher levels of water storage. Although there were concerns for flooding in and around the areas surrounding the lake and the possibility of damaging trails and vegetation, the positive impacts outweighed the risks; habitat protection, fish passage, fish screening, and water conservation efficiencies.

The earthen embankment portion of the dam was restored to reposition from erosion around the north side of the rock-masonry dam which had reduced its capacity of impounding water to the full level for which it was designed and at which it historically operated. Restorations raised the water level to an elevation of approximately 4,667 feet.

== See also ==
- List of lakes of the Alpine Lakes Wilderness
