= Jade Lake =

Freshwater lake in Washington, United States

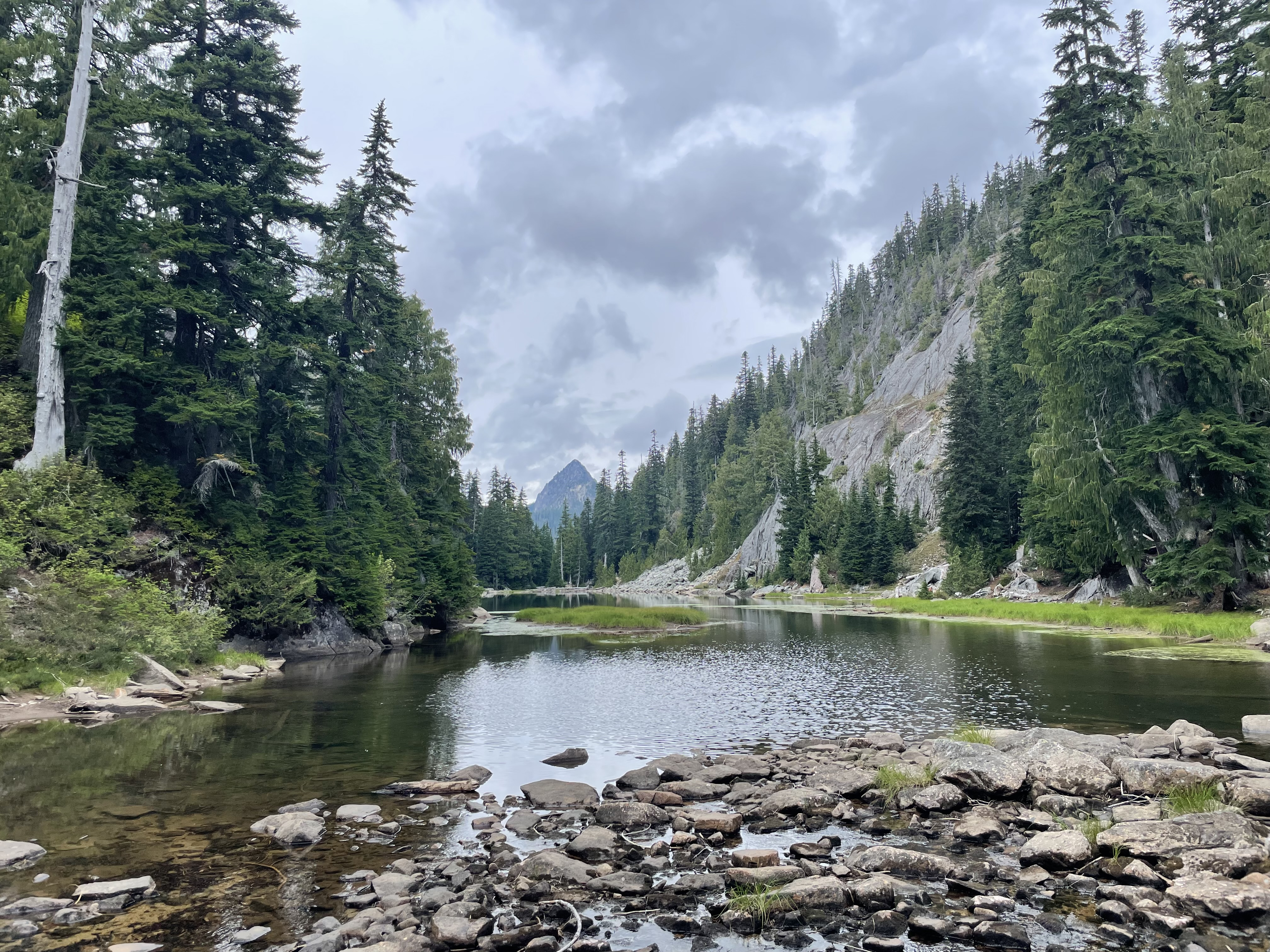
- Jade Lake in September 2024

- Location within Washington (state) Location within the United States
- Location: King County, Washington, United States
- Coordinates: 47.5848223°N 121.2578165°W
- Basin countries: United States
- Surface area: 3.8 acres (0.015 km^{2})
- Surface elevation: 4,613 ft (1,406 m)

Jade Lake, also known as Necklace Valley First Lake, is a freshwater lake located on the western region of the Alpine Lakes Wilderness, in King County, Washington. It is the first of three lakes that are connected by stream which together form the Necklace Valley Lakes. Jade Lake and its surrounding lakes and peaks are a popular area for hiking, swimming, and fishing cutthroat trout. Self-issued Alpine Lake Wilderness permit required for transit within the Necklace Valley area.

== History ==
Jade Lake is one of the Necklace Valley Lakes, which includes nearby Opal Lake and Emerald Lake. The lakes form a topographic sequence that reminds of a necklace, hence the name makes reference to a necklace strung with streams in between. A short distance east over the Necklace valley crest is Lake Iiswoot and to the west Locket Lake, both much larger than the Necklace Valley Lakes. Further east over Brown Sugar Peak lays prominent Hinman Glacier.

== See also ==
- List of lakes of the Alpine Lakes Wilderness
