= Foehn Lake =

Lake in Washington state, US

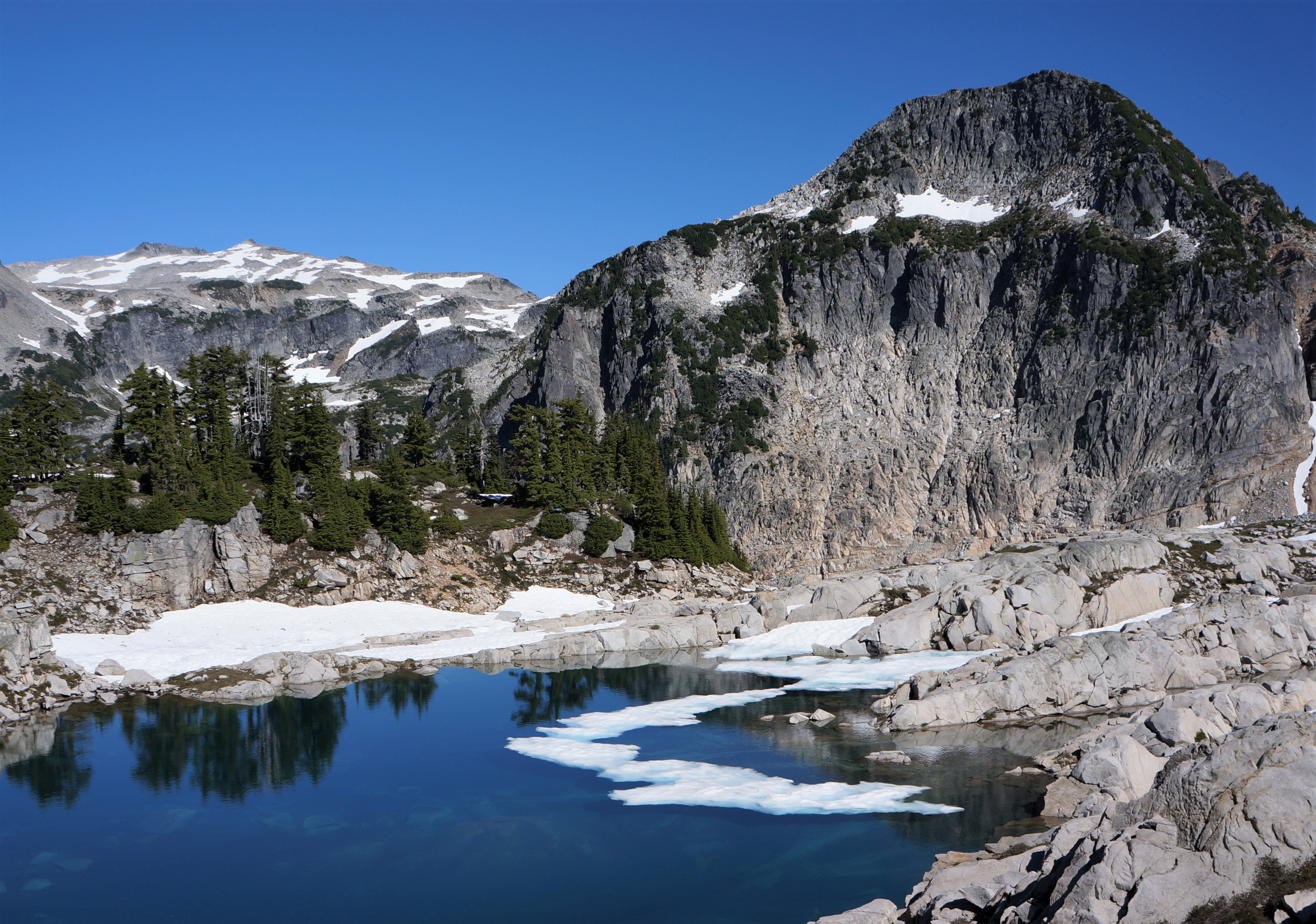
- Foehn Lake and La Bohn Peak

- Location within Washington (state) Location within the United States
- Location: King County, Washington, United States
- Coordinates: 47.558096°N 121.239866°W
- Primary inflows: La Bohn Gap
- Primary outflows: unnamed
- Basin countries: United States
- Surface elevation: 5,515 ft (1,681 m)

Foehn Lake is a small freshwater lake located on a valley on the south skirt of La Bohn Peak, in the far east border of King County, Washington. Foehn Lake is surrounded by prominent peaks and lakes at the heart of the Alpine Lakes Wilderness.

== See also ==
- List of lakes of the Alpine Lakes Wilderness
