= Chain Lakes =

Lake in Washingtion state, U.S.

- Location within Washington (state) Location within the United States
- Location: King County, Washington, United States
- Coordinates: 47.558096°N 121.239866°W
- Primary inflows: La Bohn Gap
- Primary outflows: unnamed
- Basin countries: United States
- Surface elevation: 5,515 ft (1,681 m)

Chain Lakes are a set of small freshwater lakes located on a gulley on the south skirt of La Bohn Peak, in the far east border of King County, Washington. Chain Lakes is surrounded by prominent peaks and lakes at the heart of the Alpine Lakes Wilderness.

== Mining ==
Chain Lakes is located in an area of rugged cirques and sharp ridges where mining has been occurring since 1896. The mine has been called Dutch Miller mine where prospecting has been on sulfide minerals and high grade copper deposits found in quartz-tourmaline shoots in the granodiorite rock.

== See also ==
- List of lakes of the Alpine Lakes Wilderness
