= Lake Ethel =

Lake in Washington, United States

- Location within Washington (state) Location within the United States
- Location: Kittitas County, Washington, United States
- Coordinates: 47.75048°N 120.888462°W
- Primary outflows: Gill Creek
- Basin countries: United States
- Surface area: 15.3 acres (0.062 km^{2})
- Surface elevation: 5,502 ft (1,677 m)

Ethel Lake is a small freshwater lake located on the north slope of the Chiwaukum Mountains, in Chelan County, Washington. Self-issued Alpine Lake Wilderness permit required for transit within the Klonaqua Lakes area. The lake is a popular area for hiking, swimming, and fishing Cutthroat trout and Rainbow trout.

Lake Ethel sits on a highly glaciated and semibarren alpine basin, surrounded by heather and other wildflowers and a coniferous presence primarily larch pines.

== History ==
Lake Ethel is one of the Scottish Lakes, which includes nearby Lake Donald, Loch Eileen and Lake Julius. The lakes were given names by Albert Hale Sylvester, a topographer for the United States Geological Survey working throughout the North Cascades National Park Complex around 1900. Lake Ethel was named by Sylvester after the wife of Forest Service ranger Frank Lenzie. Other lakes in the area have also been named after female family and friends of Sylvester.

== Access ==
Ethel Lake is accessed from Lake Ethel Trail #1585. The trailhead is located 2.5 miles south on Gill Creek Road #6940 off of U.S. Highway 2 in the community of Merritt. The trail crosses several private logging properties and reaches the lake in approximately 5 miles.

== See also ==
- List of lakes of the Alpine Lakes Wilderness
