= Snoqualmie Lake Potholes =

Set of lakes in Washington, United States

- Location within Washington (state) Location within the United States
- Location: King County, Washington, United States
- Coordinates: 47.55921°N 121.40353°W
- Basin countries: United States
- Surface area: 5.7 acres (0.023 km^{2})
- Surface elevation: 3,425 ft (1,044 m)

Snoqualmie Lake Potholes is a set of freshwater lakes located southeast Snoqualmie Lake, in King County, Washington. Self-issued Alpine Lake Wilderness permit required for transit within the Big Snow Mountain area. Because Snoqualmie Lake Potholes are at the heart of the Alpine Lakes Wilderness, the lake is a popular area for hiking, swimming, and fishing rainbow trout and cutthroat trout.

== Location ==
The Snoqualmie Lake Potholes are located on the north skirt of Little Bulger mountain. Other alpine mountains border the south ridges of the lake, including 2,029 metres (6,657 ft) Big Snow Mountain, 1,607 metres (5,272 ft) Sorcery Mountain, and 1,610 metres (5,280 ft) Galleon Mountain.

== Geology ==
Granitoid ridges near the lake rise to about 3,425 feet (1,044 m) above sea level. Most of the region is underlain by medium to coarsely crystalline granodiorite which are exposed on the shores of the lakes.

== Climate ==
The Snoqualmie Lake Potholes are located in a hemiboreal climate, part of the marine west coast climate zone of western North America. The warmest month is August, with an average temperature of 16 °C, and the coldest month is December, at an average of −6 °C. The wettest month is January, with 396 millimeters of rain, and the least in July, with 38 millimeters of rain.

Rampart Lakes

Climate chart (precipitation, max. and min. temperature)
J	F	M	A	M	J	J	A	S	O	N	D
396 −1 −10	354 −1 −10	331 4 −8	202 9 −4	159 15 −1	104 18 0	38 24 3	48 24 4	114 20 2	298 12 −2	353 4 −7	370 −1 −11
- █ Average max. and min. temperatures in °C
- █ Precipitation totals in mm
Imperial conversion
J	F	M	A	M	J	J	A	S	O	N	D
16 30 14	14 30 14	13 39 18	8 48 25	6.3 59 30	4.1 64 32	1.5 75 37	1.9 75 39	4.5 68 36	12 54 28	14 39 19	15 30 12
- █ Average max. and min. temperatures in °F
- █ Precipitation totals in inches

== See also ==
- List of lakes of the Alpine Lakes Wilderness
