= Loch Eileen =

Freshwater lake in Chelan County, Washington, United States

- Location within Washington (state) Location within the United States
- Location: Chelan County, Washington, United States
- Coordinates: 47.7414906°N 120.8894319°W
- Primary outflows: Roarking Creek
- Basin countries: United States
- Surface elevation: 5,512 ft (1,680 m)

Loch Eileen is a freshwater lakes located on the north slope of the Chiwaukum Mountains, in Chelan County, Washington. Self-issued Alpine Lake Wilderness permit required for transit within the Klonaqua Lakes area.

Loch Eileen sits on a highly glaciated and semibarren alpine basin, surrounded by heather and other wildflowers and a coniferous presence primarily larch pines.

== History ==
Loch Eileen is one of the Scottish Lakes, which includes nearby Lake Julius, Lake Donald and Lake Ethel. The lakes were given names by Albert Hale Sylvester, a topographer for the United States Geological Survey working throughout the North Cascades National Park Complex around 1900, named after female family and friends of Sylvester. Loche Eileen was named by Sylvester after the daughter of Forest Service Ranger Jason William.

== See also ==
- List of lakes of the Alpine Lakes Wilderness
