= Emerald Lake (Washington) =

Freshwater lake in Washington, United States

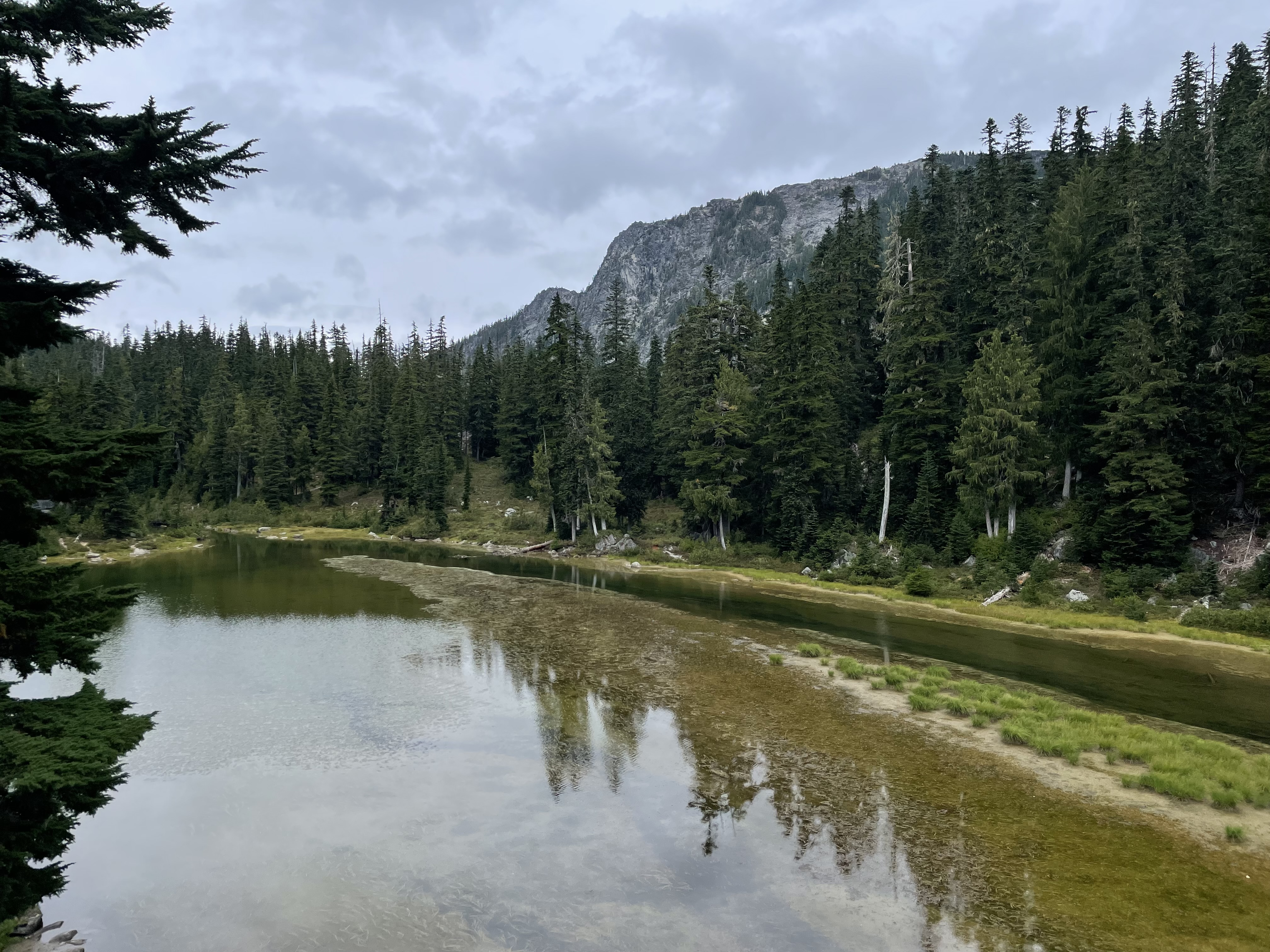
- Emerald Lake in September 2024

- Location within Washington (state) Location within the United States
- Location: King County, Washington, United States
- Coordinates: 47.5801613°N 121.2554089°W
- Basin countries: United States
- Surface area: 2.6 acres (0.011 km^{2})
- Surface elevation: 4,708 ft (1,435 m)

Emerald Lake is a freshwater lake located on the western region of the Alpine Lakes Wilderness, in King County, Washington. It is one of three lakes that are connected by stream which together form the Neckelace Valley Lakes. Emerald Lake and its surrounding lakes and peaks are a popular area for hiking, swimming, and fishing cutthroat trout and rainbow trout. Self-issued Alpine Lake Wilderness permit required for transit within the Necklace Valley area.

== History ==
Emerald Lake is one of the Necklace Valley Lakes, which includes nearby Opal Lake and Jade Lake. The lakes form a topographic sequence that reminds of a necklace, hence the name makes reference to a necklace strung with streams in between.

== See also ==
- List of lakes of the Alpine Lakes Wilderness
