= Jack Creek Fire =

2017 wildfire in Okanogan-Wenatchee National Forest, Washington, US

- Part of the 2017 Washington wildfires
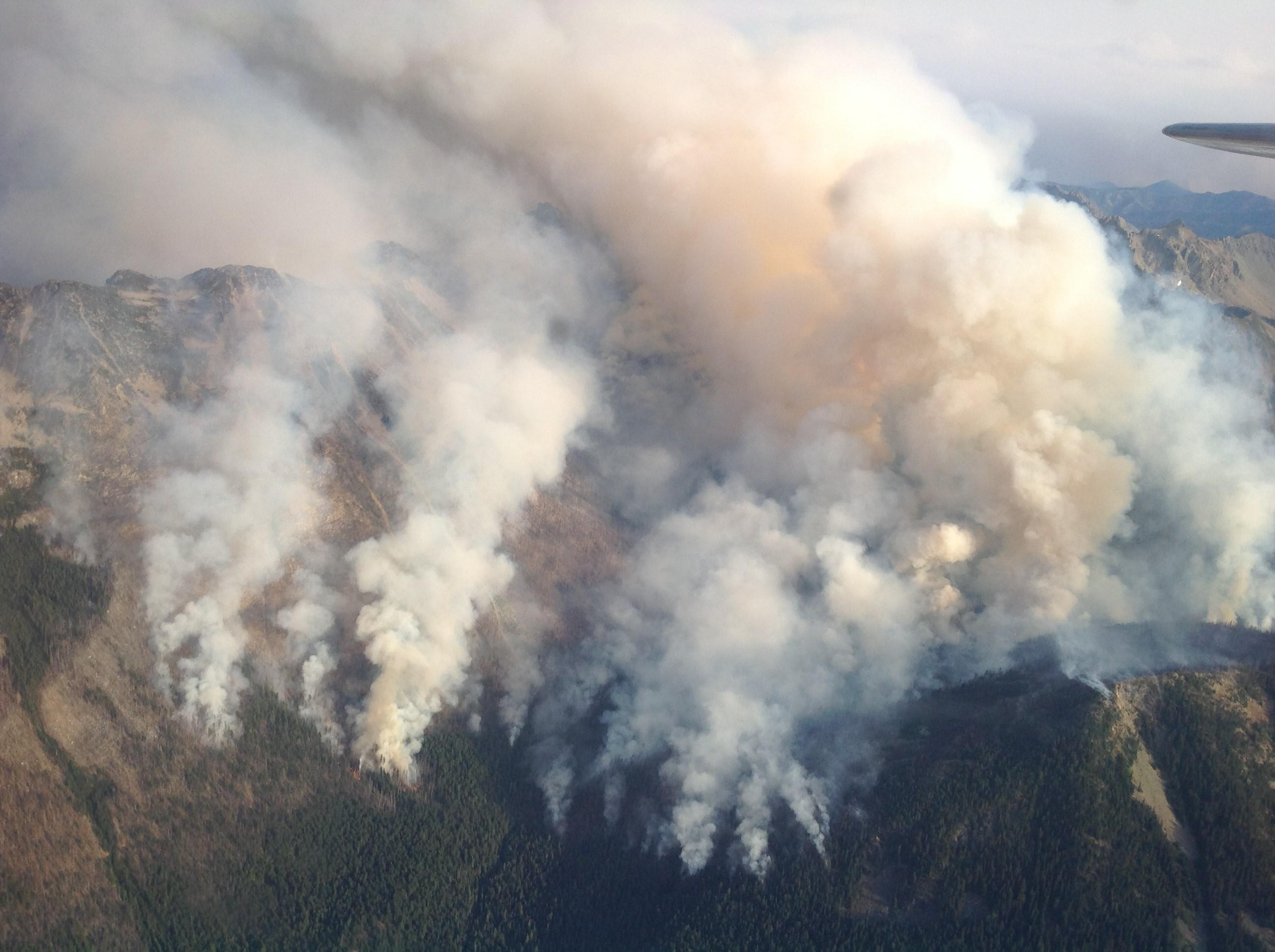
- Jack Creek Fire on September 3, 2017
- Date: August 11, 2017 – September 30, 2017
- Location: Okanogan-Wenatchee National Forest, Alpine Lakes Wilderness, Washington, United States
- Coordinates: 47.514°N 120.959°W

Statistics
- Burned area: 4,606 acres (19 km^{2})

Ignition
- Cause: Lightning

Map
- Location of fire in Washington.

The Jack Creek Fire was a wildfire in the Alpine Lakes Wilderness of the Okanogan-Wenatchee National Forest in Washington, approximately 15 miles southwest of Leavenworth, Washington in the United States. It was started by a lightning strike on August 11, 2017. The fire burned a total of 4,606 acres (19 km^{2}).

== Incidents ==
=== August ===
The Jack Creek Fire was started by a lightning strike on August 11, 2017, about 15 miles southwest of Leavenworth, Washington in the Alpine Lakes Wilderness in the Okanogan-Wenatchee National Forest. The lightning was caused by a cold frontal passage that tracked through the area. It remained dormant for weeks, only growing to 7 acres (0.03 km^{2}) before it burned into receptive fuels and grew.

=== September ===
By September 3, the fire had grown to approximately 700 acres (3 km^{2}) due to warm temperatures and low humidity. On September 11, the fire made a run, growing to 1,600 acres (6 km^{2}) by expanding into the Stuart Lake and Eightmile drainages.

The fire caused the United States Forest Service to close a number of areas in the impacted recreational areas, including Colchuck Lake, Meadow Creek, Snowwall, Blackjack Ridge, Jack Ridge, Eightmile, Stuart Lake, Van Epps and Trout Lake trails. Select trails reopened on September 26. By that day, the fire had grown to 3,724 acres (15 km^{2}) and as zero percent contained. By the end of the month, the fire burned a total of 4,606 acres (19 km^{2}).

== Effects/Impacts ==
In October 2017, the Central Washington Burned Area Emergency Response completed an assessment of the burned area, and requested $12,385 for emergency treatments, primarily due to soil erosion and post-fire flooding concerns. An estimated four miles of trails along Jack Creek, Van Epps and Eightmile drainages have increased threats of rockfalls and flooding.
