= Upper Melakwa Lake =

Lake in King County, Washington state, US

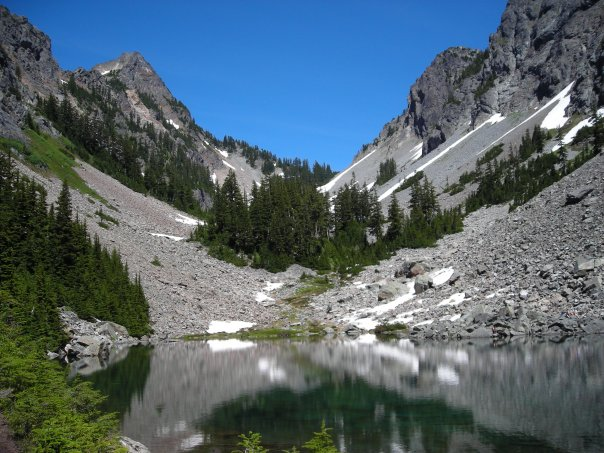
- A view of Upper Melakwa Lake looking towards Melakwa Pass

- Location within Washington (state) Location within the United States
- Location: King County, Washington, United States
- Coordinates: 47.452612°N 121.470650°W
- Primary outflows: Pratt River
- Basin countries: United States
- Surface elevation: 4,508 ft (1,374 m)

Upper Melakwa Lake is a tiny lake located in King County in Washington. It is the source of the Pratt River.

The lake is located a short distance upstream from Melakwa Lake. The lake is easily reached by walking upstream from Melakwa Lake; however, a lot of people are too tired to continue after the somewhat difficult trip to Melakwa Lake. By continuing north from the lake, you will eventually reach Melakwa Pass.
