= Pratt River =

River in northwest Washington, United States

- Location of the mouth of the Pratt River in Washington Pratt River (the United States)

Location
- Country: United States
- State: Washington
- County: King County

Physical characteristics
- Source: Upper Melakwa Lake
  - location: North Cascades
- Mouth: Middle Fork Snoqualmie River
  - coordinates: 47°31′31″N 121°35′10″W

National Wild and Scenic River
- Type: Wild
- Designated: December 19, 2014

The Pratt River is a river in King County in Washington. It is a tributary of the Middle Fork Snoqualmie River. It was named for prospector George A Pratt, who discovered nearby iron deposits in 1887.

The river has its headwaters in tiny Upper Melakwa Lake. The river starts out as a small stream upon exiting the lake. The river soon enters much larger and better known Melakwa Lake. The river after exiting Melakwa Lake, drops down the headwall below the lake starts to turn north. The river flows generally north until it converges with the Middle Fork Snoqualmie River.

== Tributaries ==
- Tushohatchie Creek
- Kulla Kulla Creek
- Kaleetan Creek
- Thompson Creek

== See also ==
- List of rivers in Washington
