= Judy Lake =

- Location within Michigan
- Location: Berrien County, Michigan
- Coordinates: 41°52′18″N 86°26′52″W
- Type: lake
- Surface area: 16.23 acres (6.57 ha)

Judy Lake is a lake in Berrien County, in the U.S. state of Michigan. The lake has a size of 16.23 acres (6.57 ha).

The name "Judy Lake" is a corruption of "Juday", the last name of J. Juday, the original owner of the site.
