= Lake Donald =

Lake in Washington, United States

- Location within Washington (state) Location within the United States
- Location: Kittitas County, Washington, United States
- Coordinates: 47.7351099°N 120.8903753°W
- Primary outflows: Roarking Creek
- Basin countries: United States
- Surface area: 11.6 acres (0.047 km^{2})
- Surface elevation: 5,876 ft (1,791 m)

Lake Donald is a freshwater lakes located on the north slope of the Chiwaukum Mountains, in Chelan County, Washington. The lake is a popular area for hiking, swimming, and fishing Cutthroat trout and Rainbow trout. Self-issued Alpine Lake Wilderness permit required for transit within the Klonaqua Lakes area.

== History ==
Lake Donald is one of the Scottish Lakes, which includes nearby Lake Julius, Loch Eileen and Lake Ethel. The lakes were given names by Albert Hale Sylvester, a topographer for the United States Geological Survey working throughout the North Cascades National Park Complex around 1900, named after female family and friends of Sylvester.

== See also ==
- List of lakes of the Alpine Lakes Wilderness
