= Margaret Lake (Kittitas County, Washington) =

Lake in the Alpine Lakes Wilderness, Washington, United States

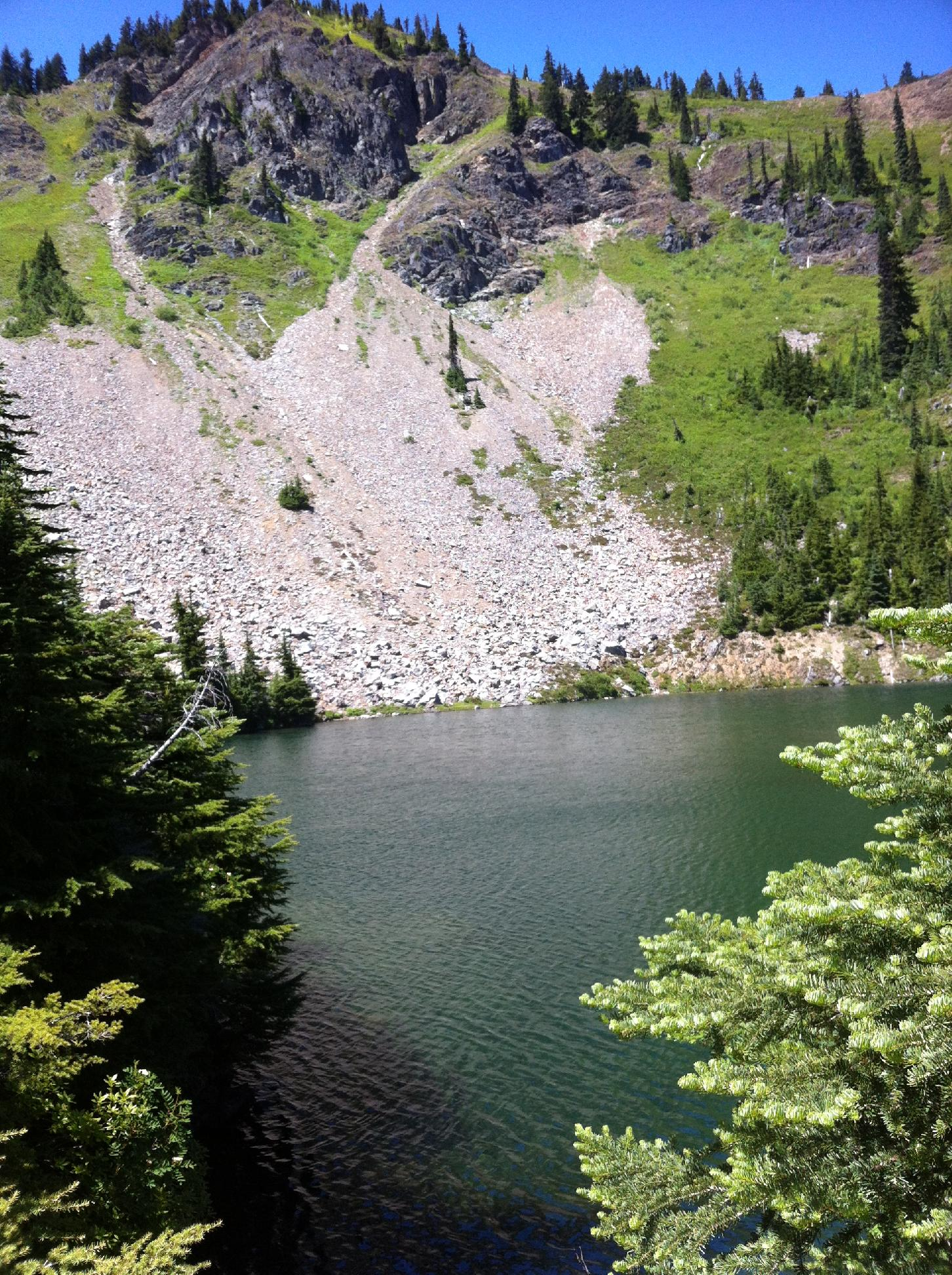
- Lake Margaret looking toward Mount Margaret

- Location within Washington (state) Location within the United States
- Location: Kittitas County, Washington
- Coordinates: 47°22′52″N 121°20′8″W
- Basin countries: United States
- Surface area: 4.1 acres (1.7 ha)
- Surface elevation: 4,790 ft (1,460 m)
- Islands: 0

Margaret Lake is located in Kittitas County, Washington. The lake is a popular area for hiking. It's also stocked with rainbow trout.

== Name ==
Along with neighboring peaks and lakes, Margaret Lake was given its name by Albert Hale Sylvester, a topographer for the United States Geological Survey working throughout the North Cascades National Park Complex in the 1900s. The name is purported to be from the name of a sister of ranger Burne Canby who accompanied Sylvester on his camping trips.

== See also ==
- List of lakes of the Alpine Lakes Wilderness
