= Mount Margaret (Kittitas County, Washington) =

Mountain in Washington (state)

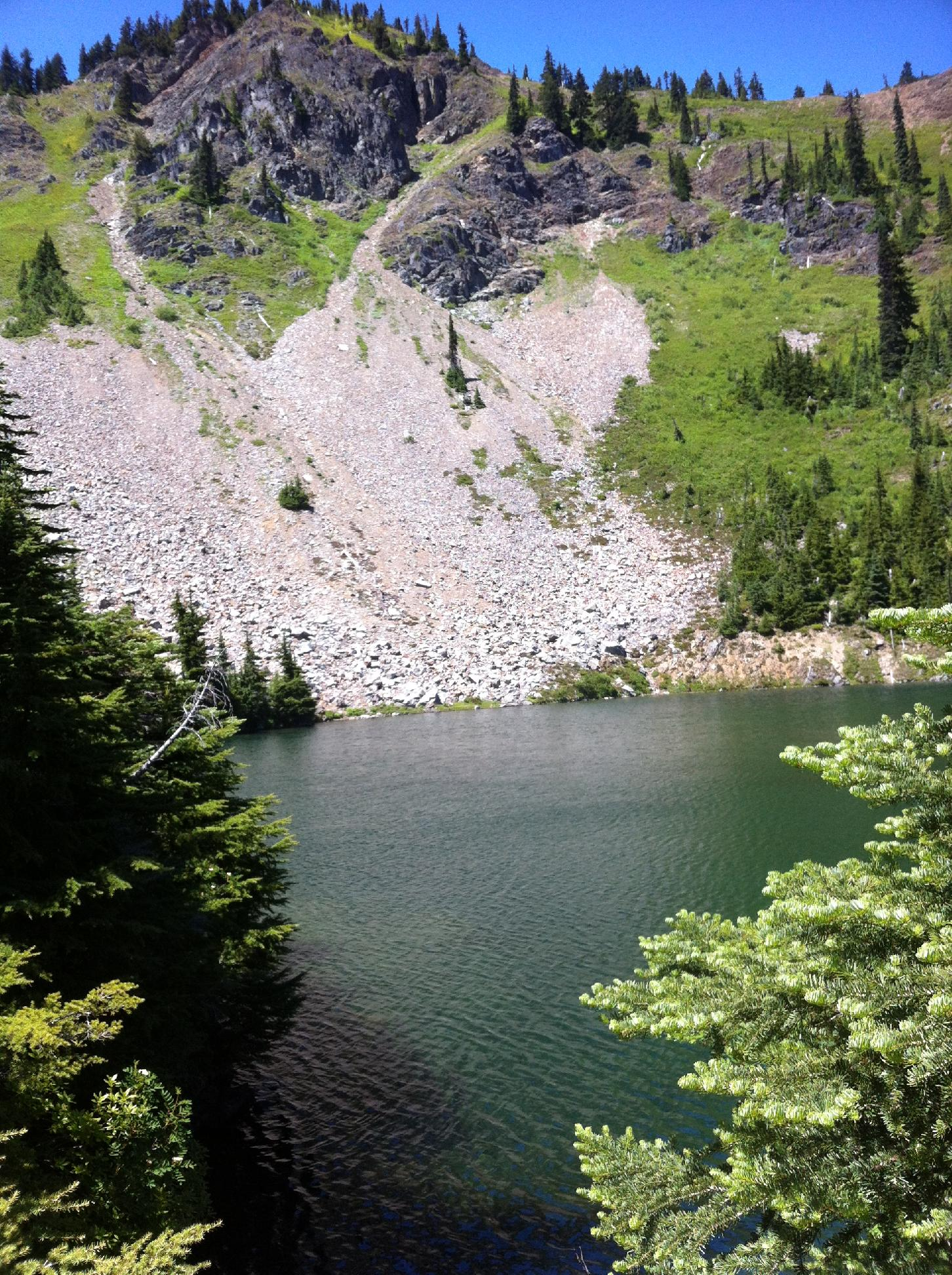
- Southeast aspect, Margaret Lake in the foreground

Highest point
- Elevation: 5,561 ft (1,695 m)
- Prominence: 440 ft (130 m)
- Parent peak: Rampart Ridge (5,870 ft)
- Isolation: 0.88 mi (1.42 km)
- Coordinates: 47°22′59″N 121°20′22″W

Geography
- Location within Washington (state) Location within the United States
- Location: Mount Baker–Snoqualmie National Forest; Kittitas County, Washington, U.S.
- Parent range: Cascade Range
- Topo map: USGS Chikamin Peak

Geology
- Volcanic arc: Cascade Volcanic Arc

Climbing
- Easiest route: class 1 hiking via trail

Mount Margaret is a 5,850-ft (1,780 m) mountain summit located in the Wenatchee National Forest, in the Alpine Lakes Wilderness, in Kittitas County of Washington state. It is situated in the Cascade Range, 4.5 mi (7.2 km) east of Interstate 90, and on the south aspect of Rampart Ridge. Its nearest higher neighbor is Alta Mountain, 4.93 mi (7.93 km) to the north. Keechelus Lake is a short distance west and Kachess Lake further east.

== Name ==
Along with neighboring peaks and lakes, Mount Margaret given its name by Albert Hale Sylvester, a topographer for the United States Geological Survey working throughout the North Cascades National Park Complex in the 1900s. The name is purported to be from the name of a sister of ranger Burne Canby who accompanied Sylvester on his camping trips.

== Geology ==
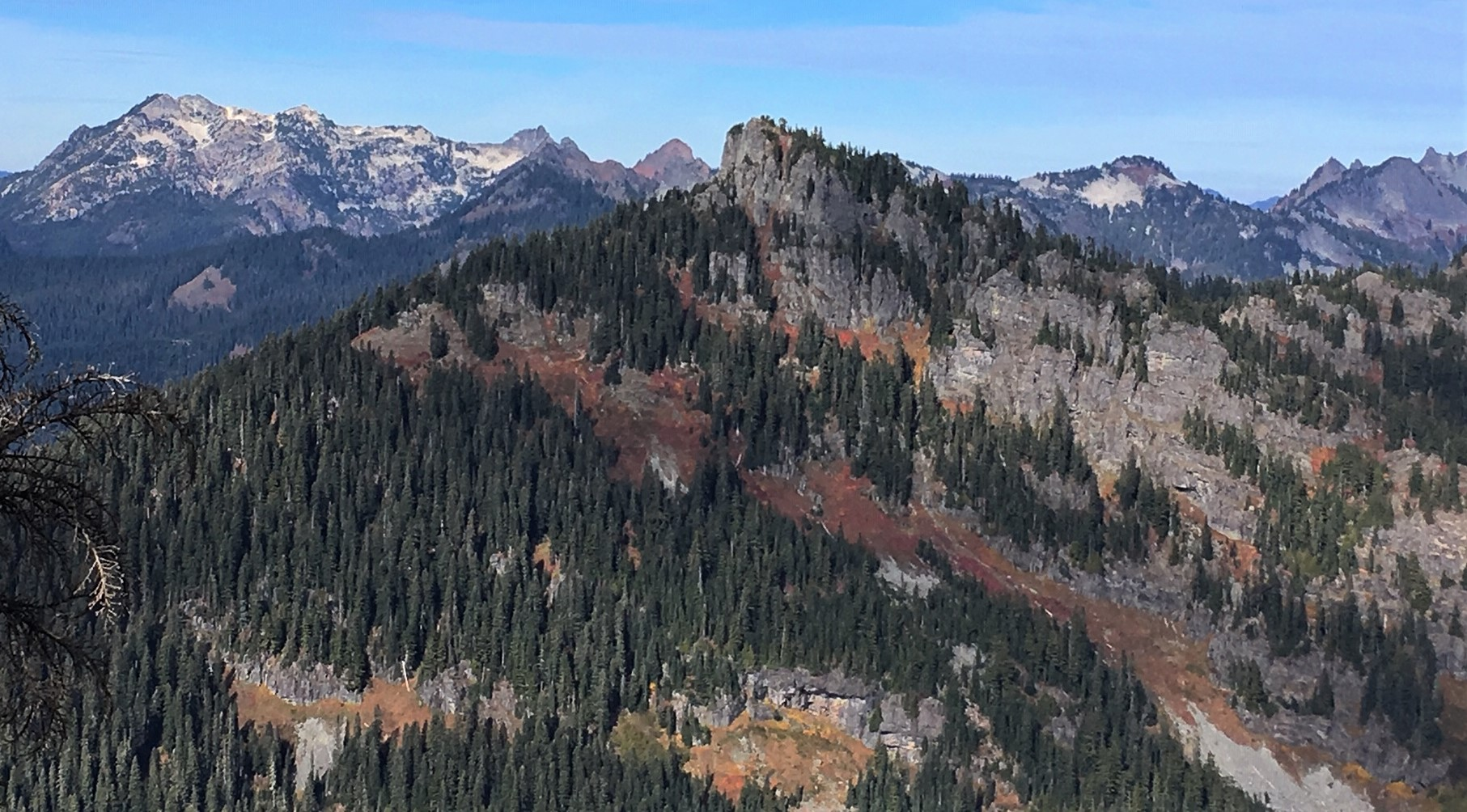
View due north from Mt Margaret.

Mount Margaret is part of the rugged topography within the Cascade Range in the state of Washington surrounded by the Alpine Lakes Wilderness. The history of the formation of the Cascade Mountains dates back millions of years ago to the late Eocene Epoch. Geological events including tectonic reorganization and extense magmatism created the features of Mount Margaret and its surroundings with craggy peaks and ridges, deep glacial valleys, and granite walls. The diverse topography and drastic elevation changes over the Cascade Range lead to various climate differences. During the Pleistocene period dating back over two million years ago, glaciation advancing and retreating repeatedly scoured and shaped the landscape. With the North American Plate overriding the Pacific Plate, episodes of volcanic igneous activity occurred. The last glacial retreat in the Alpine Lakes area began about 14,000 years ago and was north of the Canada–US border 10,000 years ago. The U-shaped cross section of the river valleys is a result of that recent glaciation. Uplift and faulting in combination with glaciation has been the dominant processes that have created the tall peaks and deep valleys of the Alpine Lakes Wilderness area.

== Climate ==
Mount Margaret is located within a marine west coast climate zone of western North America. Most weather fronts originate in the Pacific Ocean, and travel northeast toward the Cascade Mountains. As fronts approach, they are forced upward by the peaks of the Cascade Range (Orographic lift), causing them to drop their moisture in the form of rain or snowfall onto the Cascades. As a result, the west side of the Cascades experiences high precipitation, especially during the winter months in the form of snowfall. During the winter months, weather is usually cloudy, but due to high-pressure systems over the Pacific Ocean that intensify during summer months, there is often little or no cloud cover during the summer. Because of maritime influence, snow tends to be wet and heavy, resulting in high avalanche danger. The months July through September offer the most favorable weather for viewing or climbing Mt Margaret.

== See also ==
- Geology of the Pacific Northwest
- List of mountain peaks of Washington (state)
