= Melakwa Lake =

Lake in the Alpine Lakes Wilderness, Washington, United States

Upper Melakwa Lake
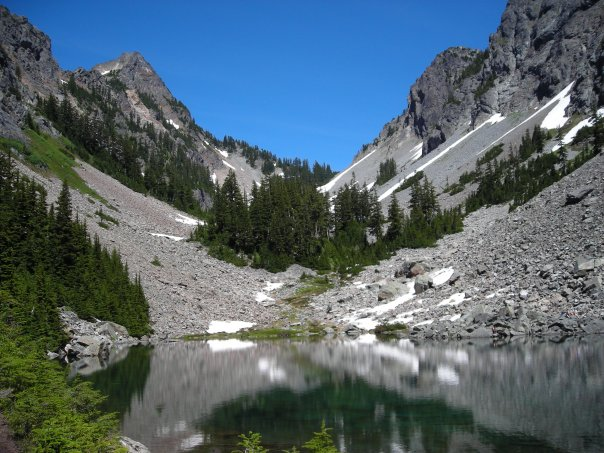
- bordered by Chair Peak (to the right) and Kaleetan Peak (to the left)

- Location within Washington (state) Location within the United States
- Location: King County, Washington, United States
- Coordinates: 47°27′1.16″N 121°28′8.27″W
- Primary inflows: Pratt River
- Primary outflows: Pratt River
- Basin countries: United States
- Surface elevation: 4,505 ft (1,373 m)

Melakwa Lake is a lake in King County, Washington. The name Melakwa comes from the Chinook Jargon word for "mosquito," derived from the French word maringouin. It is located along the Pratt River just below the river's true source.

== Access ==
It is off of I-90 and can be accessed from the Denny Creek trail head. It is accessible via a moderate, all-day hike from Denny Creek to Melakwa Lake.

== Characteristics ==
The lake is located in a narrow valley, with Chair Peak to the east and Kaleetan Peak to the west, and is usually accessible by late June. It is known for its clear water and beautiful blue-green color. A short scramble up the talus slope on the north end of the lake leads to Melakwa Pass, where views of Gem Lake, Glacier Peak, and the North Cascades are visible on clear days.

== See also ==
- Upper Melakwa Lake
- List of Chinook Jargon place names
