= Merritt, Washington =

Unincorporated community in Washington, United States

- Unincorporated community
- Location within Washington (state)
- Coordinates: 47°46′51″N 120°50′35″W
- Country: United States
- State: Washington
- County: Chelan
- Elevation: 2,192 ft (668 m)
- Time zone: UTC-8 (Pacific (PST))
  - Summer (DST): UTC-7 (PDT)
- ZIP code: 98826
- Area code: 509
- GNIS feature ID: 1523012

Merritt is an unincorporated community in Chelan County, Washington, United States. Merritt is on U.S. Route 2 in the upper valley area along Nason Creek in the Wenatchee National Forest, located 20 miles west of downtown Leavenworth. Merritt is assigned the ZIP code 98826. Steep slopes surround the community, rising to more than 8,000 feet in the Chiwaukum Mountains to the south.
