= Alpine Lakes Wilderness =

Wilderness area in Washington (state)

- IUCN category Ib (wilderness area)
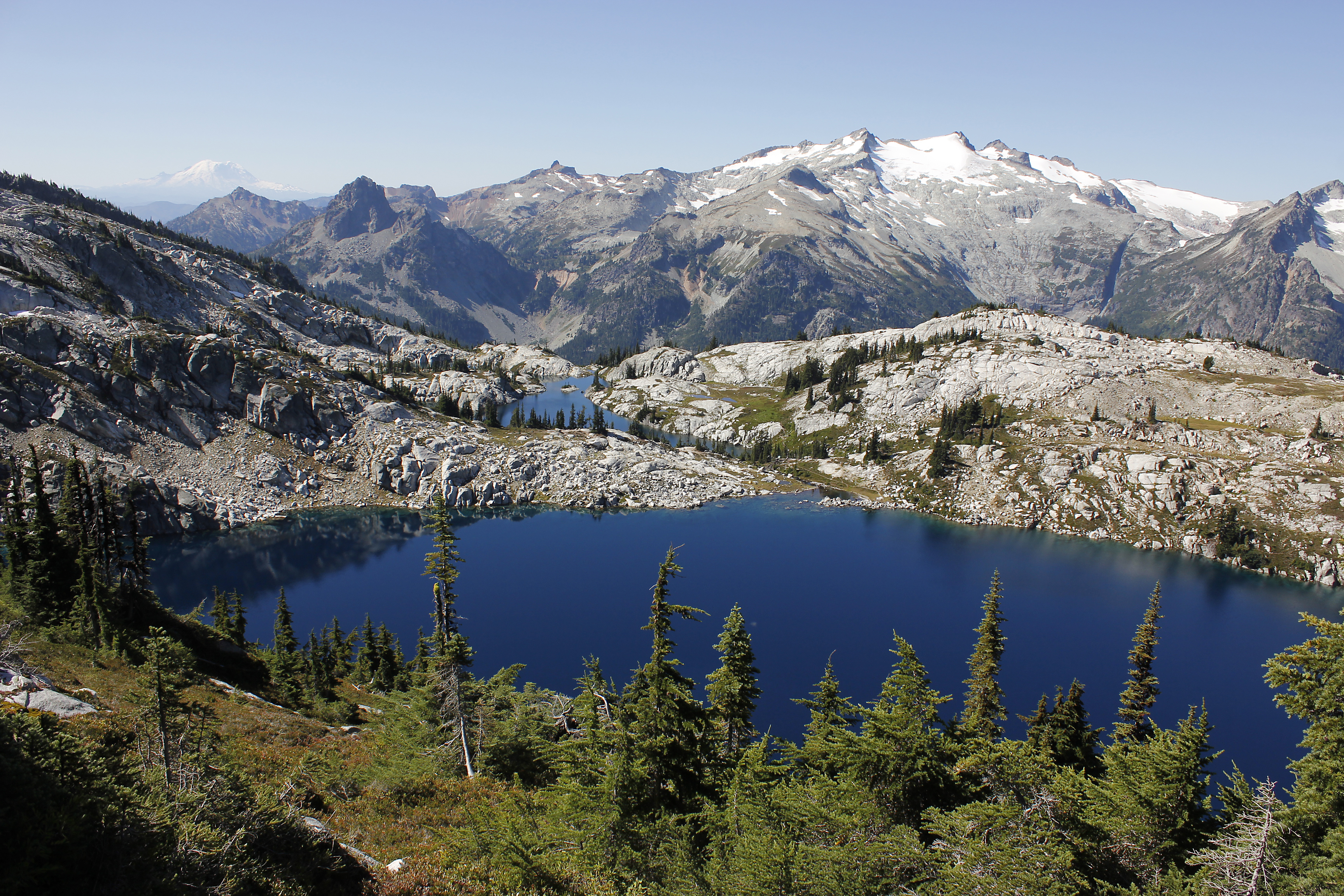
- Robin Lakes and Mount Daniel within the wilderness

- Location within Washington (state) Location within the United States
- Location: Chelan / King / Kittitas counties, Washington, USA
- Nearest city: North Bend, WA
- Coordinates: 47°33′56″N 121°10′42″W
- Area: 414,161 acres (1,676.05 km^{2})
- Established: 1976
- Governing body: United States Forest Service

The Alpine Lakes Wilderness is a large wilderness area spanning the Central Cascades of Washington state in the United States. The wilderness is located in parts of Wenatchee National Forest and Snoqualmie National Forest, and is approximately bounded by Interstate 90 and Snoqualmie Pass to the south and U.S. Route 2 and Stevens Pass to the north. The Alpine Lakes is the largest wilderness area near the population centers of Puget Sound, counted at 414,161 acres (167,605 ha) following the 2014 expansion.

== History ==
The wilderness was originally designated the Alpine Lakes Limited Area in 1946, but this designation did not offer protection from resource extractions and was exclusively regulated by the United States Forest Service. The region and adjacent areas were being extensively used for mining, timber extraction, and fur trapping leading to roads, clear cuts and ecological degradation. Efforts to further protect the lower valley forests of Alpine Lakes began in the 1950s by the North Cascades Conservation Council formed in 1957 and in October 1968 the Alpine Lakes Protection Society was formed. However, it was the plans of the Snoqualmie National Forest to expand timber sales and build a road up the Miller River valley to Lake Dorothy and then onto the Middle Fork of the Snoqualmie River to the city of North Bend that started a grassroots campaign to remove the unilateral decision-making authority away from the Forest Service. In addition, there was much criticism by conservationists that recreational usage should not be exclusive to the upper alpine terrain as the regional forestry leadership advocated saving the lower forests for possible timber sales. A powerful and key amendment to the Wilderness Act by Wayne Aspinall, a Colorado congressman, gave Congress and not federal land agencies the ability to propose, debate, and vote on new wilderness designations.

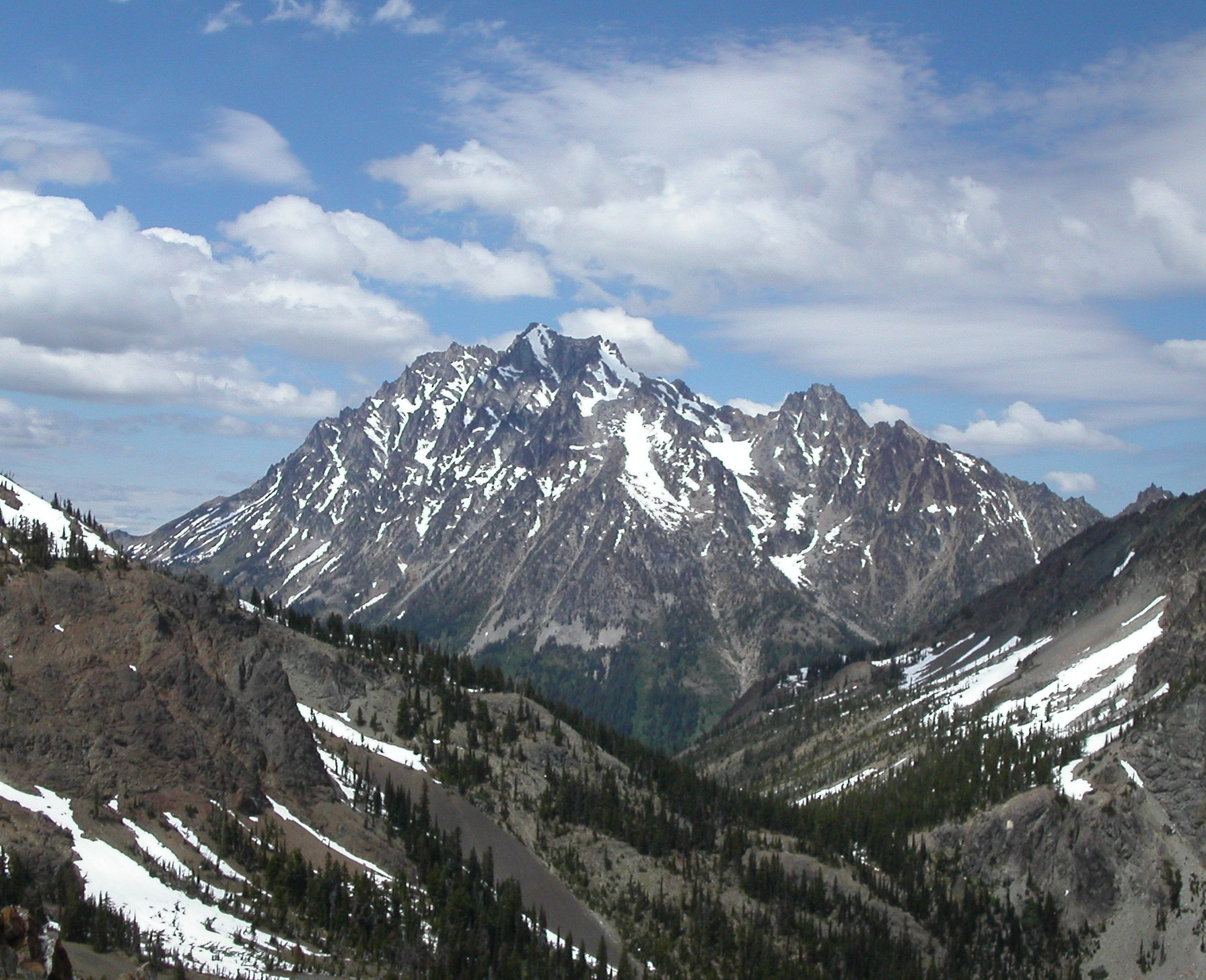
Mount Stuart, 9,415 feet (2,870 m), the highest point in the wilderness area

After exhausting debates, public meetings and with even a request by the Forest Service to veto, President Ford signed the Alpine Lakes Area Management Act into law on the afternoon of July 12, 1976, reportedly saying "anywhere so beautiful should be preserved." Following this designation four properties in the Alpine Lakes Area were listed in the National Register of Historic Places: Stevens Pass Historic District, Salmon La Sac Guard Station, the Blewett Arrastra and the townsite of Liberty.

=== Expansion ===
On December 12, 2014, Congress passed legislation expanding the Alpine Lakes Wilderness by 22,000 acres in the Middle Fork Snoqualmie Valley and granting National Wild and Scenic River status to sections of the Middle Fork Snoqualmie and Pratt Rivers. The legislation was included as part of a package of 100 public lands bills attached to the 2015 National Defense Authorization Act. President Obama signed the legislation into law on December 19, 2014, marking the first major wilderness area designation in Washington State since the addition of Wild Sky Wilderness in 2008.

== Geology ==
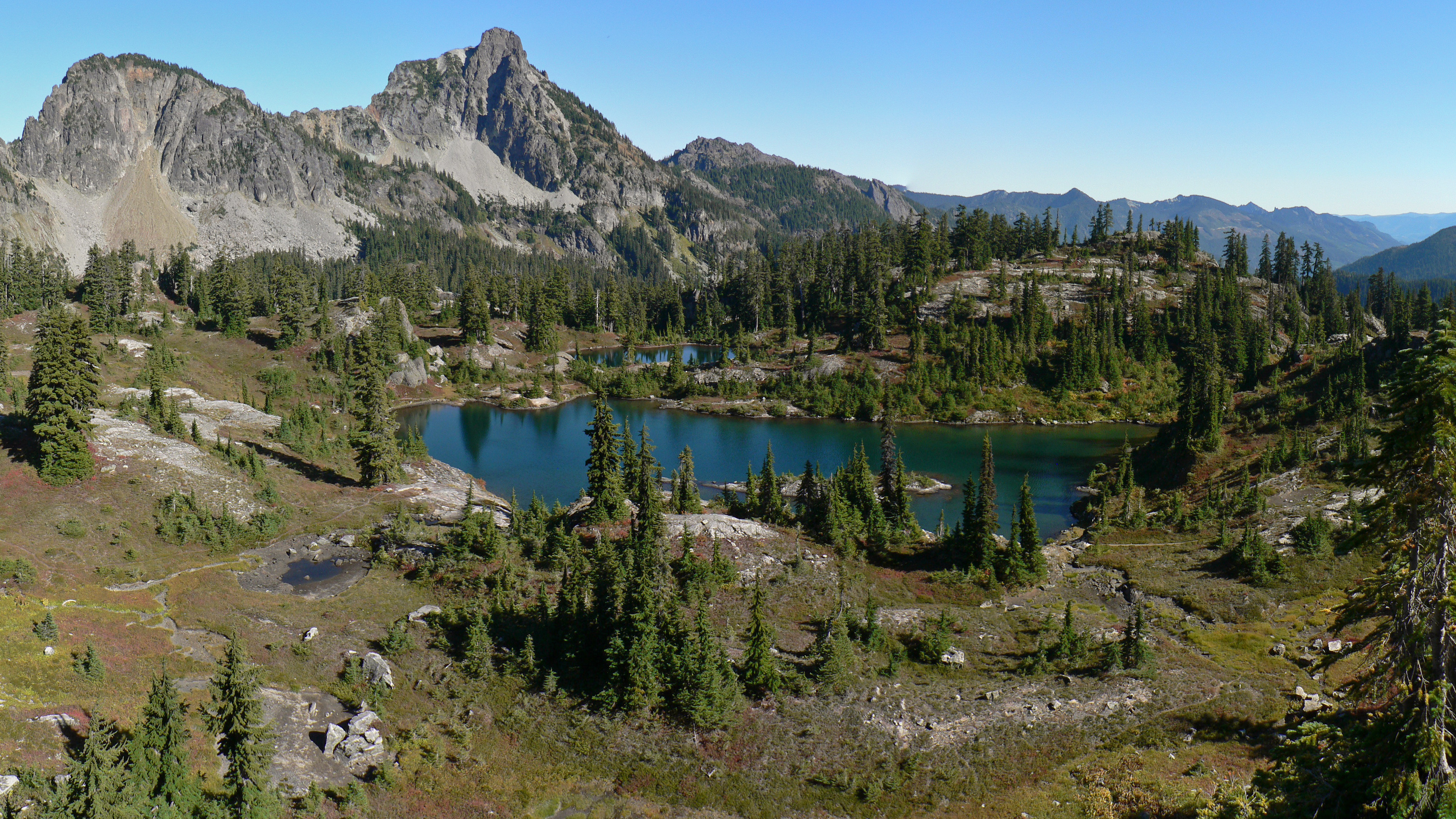
Lila Lake on Rampart Ridge with Hibox Mountain, 6,547 ft (1,996 m), behind

The Alpine Lakes Wilderness features some of the most rugged topography in the Cascade Range with craggy peaks and ridges, deep glacial valleys, and granite walls spotted with over 700 mountain lakes. Geological events occurring many years ago created the diverse topography and drastic elevation changes over the Cascade Range leading to the various climate differences. These climate differences lead to vegetation variety defining the ecoregions in this area. The elevation range of this area is between about 1,000 feet (300 m) in the lower elevations to over 9,000 feet (2,700 m) on Mount Stuart.

The history of the formation of the Cascade Mountains dates back millions of years ago to the late Eocene Epoch. With the North American Plate overriding the Pacific Plate, episodes of volcanic igneous activity persisted. In addition, small fragments of the oceanic and continental lithosphere called terranes created the North Cascades about 50 million years ago.

During the Pleistocene period dating back over two million years ago, glaciation advancing and retreating repeatedly scoured the landscape leaving deposits of rock debris. The last glacial retreat in the Alpine Lakes area began about 14,000 years ago and was north of the Canada–US border by 10,000 years ago. The U-shaped cross section of the river valleys is a result of that recent glaciation. Uplift and faulting in combination with glaciation have been the dominant processes which have created the tall peaks and deep valleys of the Alpine Lakes Wilderness area.

The most common rock type in this area is intrusive igneous, which are highly fragmented granitics; this includes most of the Foss Lakes and Enchantment Lakes area. The other major rock types are sedimentary, metamorphics, ultrabasic rock complex and the extrusive igneous group that include basalt, andesite, and rhyolite. The metamorphic rocks are primarily in the northern part and the southern area is made up of volcanic and sedimentary rocks. The Wenatchee Mountains are mostly composed of peridotite.

== Ecology ==
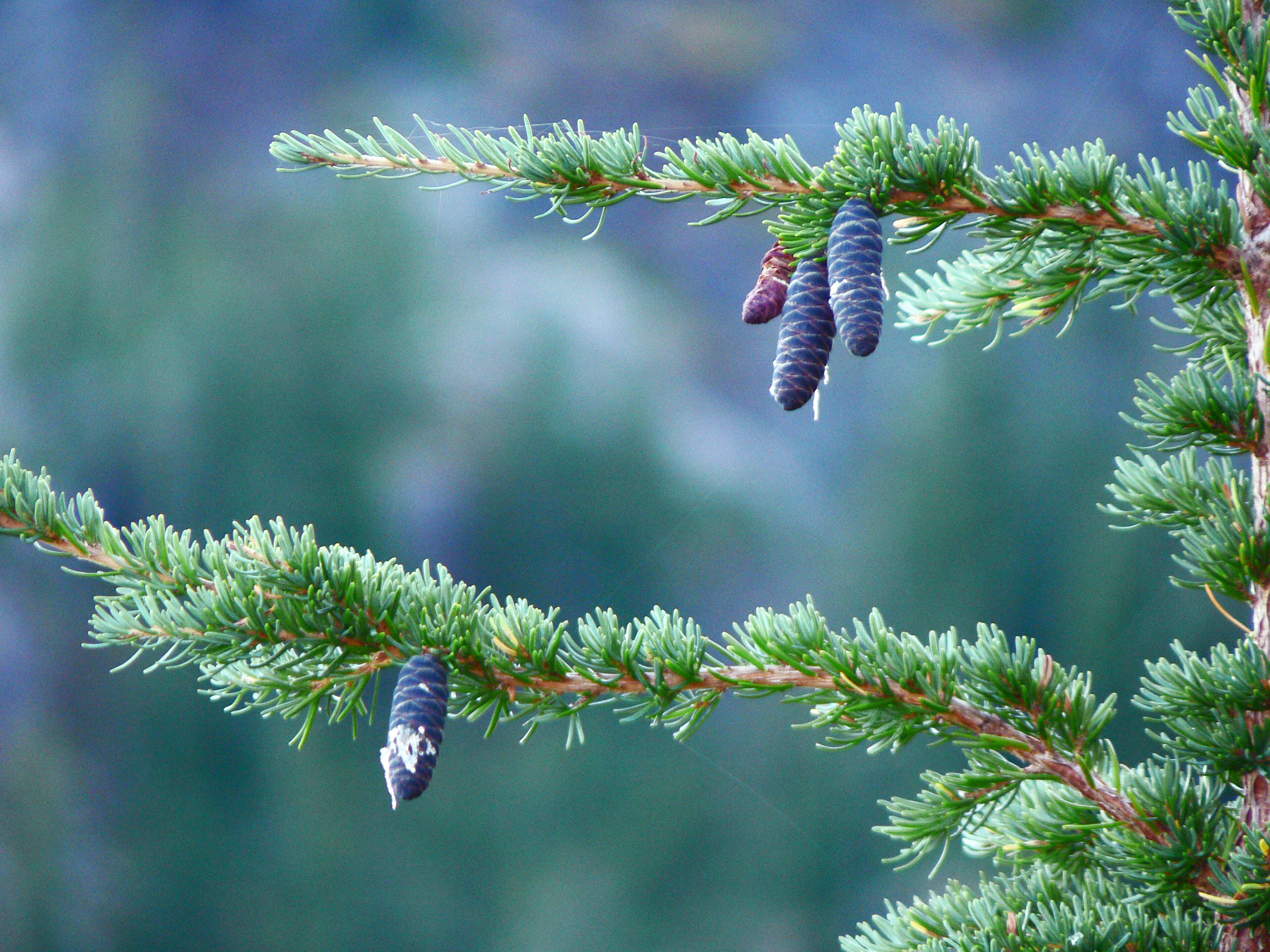
Mountain hemlock, Alpine Lakes Wilderness

The Alpine Lakes Wilderness is considered by the U.S. Environmental Protection Agency to be in the North Cascades ecoregion, dominated by forests, subalpine, and alpine ecozones. Indicator tree species of individual zones include the Western Hemlock, Pacific Silver Fir, Subalpine Mountain Hemlock, Subalpine Fir, and Grand Fir/Douglas Fir.

The Alpine Lakes Wilderness offers an abundance of diversity in both plant and animal species. The Alpine Lakes Wilderness and its old growth forests offer critical habitat for many species on the Washington State Department of Fish and Wildlife's "Species of Concern" list which includes the Western spotted frog (Rana pretiosa), Common Loon (Gavia immer), Western Grebe (Aechmophorus occidentalis), Goshawk (Accipiter gentilis), Golden eagle (Aquila chrysaetos), Bald eagle (Haliaeetus leucocephalus), Peregrine falcon (Falco peregrinus), Merlin (Falco columbarius), Flammulated owl (Otus flammeolus), Spotted owl (Strix occidentalis), Vaux's swift (Chaetura vauxi), PIleated woodpecker (Dryocopus pileatus), Lewis' woodpecker (Melanerpes lewis), White-headed woodpecker (Picoides albolarvatus), Black-backed Three-toed woodpecker (Picoides arcticus), Horned lark (Eremophila alpestris), White-breasted nuthatch (Sitta carolinensis), Sage thrasher (Oreoscoptes montanus), Loggerhead shrike (Lanius ludovicianus), Vesper sparrow (Pooecetes gramineus), Sage sparrow (Amphispiza belli), Townsend's Big-eared bat (Plecotus townsendi), Fisher (Pekania pennanti), wolverine (Gulo gulo) and the Canada lynx (Lynx canadensis).

The Alpine Lakes Wilderness offers many ecological benefits. The wilderness offers exceptional water quality and holds portions, or all of, the headwaters for the Skykomish, Snoqualmie, Wenatchee, and Yakima Rivers. The Skykomish and Snoqualmie Rivers flow to the west into the Snohomish River and the Wenatchee and Yakima Rivers flow eastward into the Columbia River. In addition to over 700 lakes this area offers over 300 miles (480 km) of Forest Service class one and two streams. The Alpine Lakes Wilderness plays a significant role in both domestic water use and irrigation in its surrounding region. This is critical with the increasing challenge to provide an adequate supply of clean water with the growing population and increase in agricultural demands. Expansion of the Alpine Lakes Wilderness into the Pratt River area would allow for further protection of the lower elevation forests of this region and the lower water shed. In addition, those forests serve to reduce flooding.

== Management ==
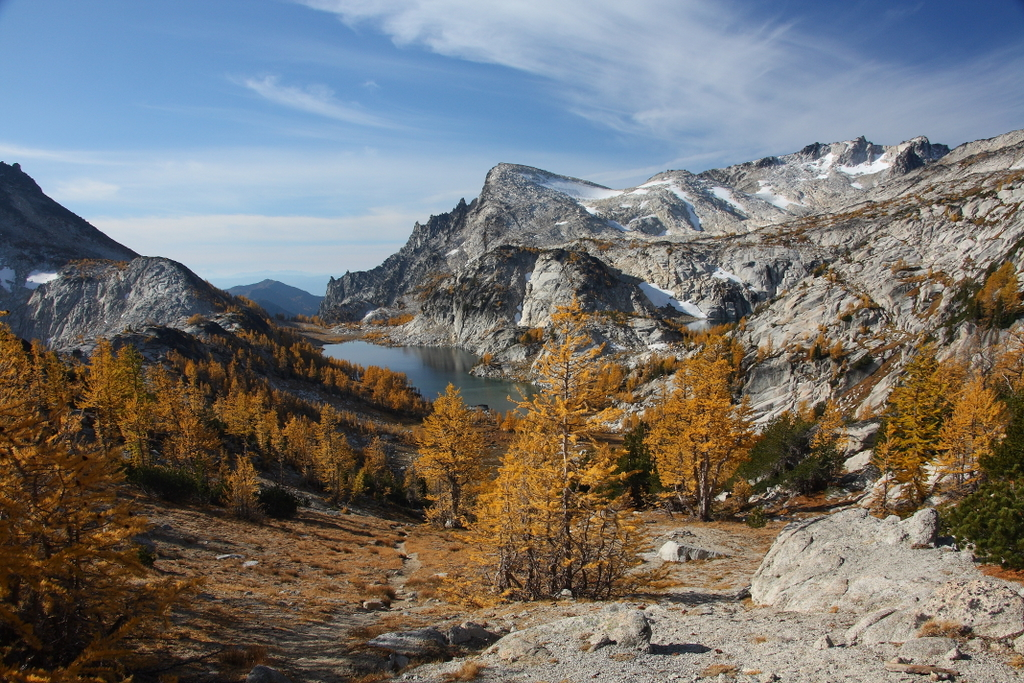
Enchantment Lakes basin from Prusik Pass

The Alpine Lakes Wilderness is managed by the Mount Baker-Snoqualmie National Forest in the west and the Okanogan-Wenatchee National Forest in the east. There are four Ranger Districts—Cle Elum, Leavenworth, Snoqualmie, and Skykomish—that administer this land. The Alpine Lakes Wilderness area is one of the most popular outdoor recreational areas in the State of Washington. Although this area has the wilderness designation and no motorized vehicles such as cars, motorcycles, or even bicycles can operate in this area, there is heavy foot traffic and camping throughout. Because of this heavy foot traffic, managing the Alpine Lakes Wilderness area to preserve its integrity is very challenging. This recreational area's popularity has led to physical, biological, and social impacts.

The Forest Service has taken many steps to minimize the environmental impacts of heavy recreational use. Education/information is a primary method used by the Forest Service. Other methods include Wilderness Ranger contacts, regulation, permits, restoration efforts, and trail clearing. Due to the popularity of the Enchantment Lakes area within the Alpine Lakes Wilderness, wilderness permits are required. These permits must be applied for well in advance of the visit and are awarded at random.

== Recreation ==
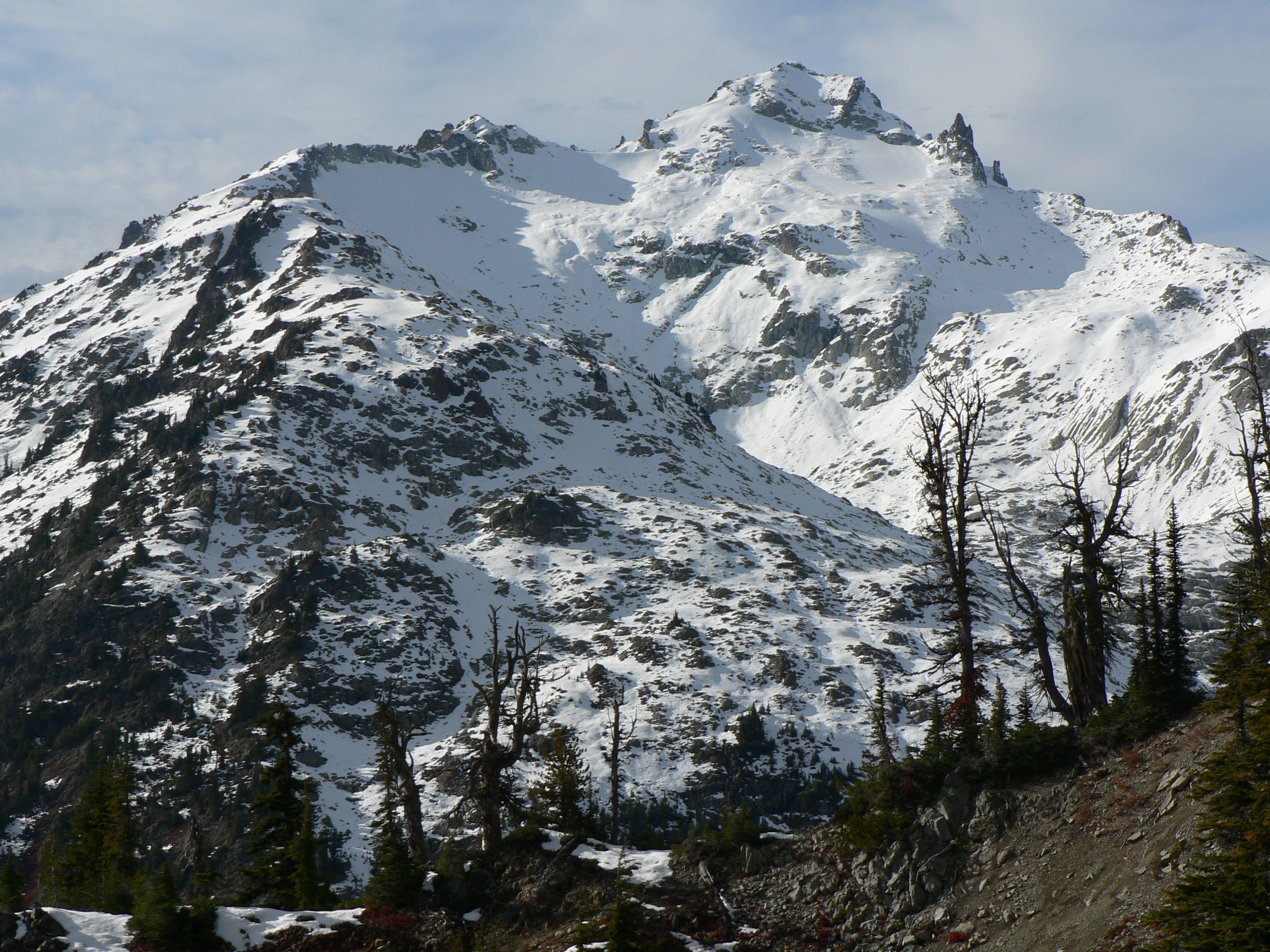
Mount Daniel, 7,960 ft (2,426 m), with early fall snow

The western end of the Alpine Lakes Wilderness is accessible via the Middle Fork of the Snoqualmie River northeast of North Bend, Washington. Snoqualmie Pass provides access to the southwestern end of the wilderness. Salmon La Sac north of Roslyn, Washington is a hub for trailheads and U.S. Forest Service roads providing entry into the southern and central regions. The Stuart Range on the eastern end of the wilderness is accessible by Ingalls Creek on the south and Icicle Creek, near Leavenworth, Washington, on the north. North of Icicle Creek are the Chiwaukum Mountains which stretch northwards to Highway 2. The northern parts of the Alpine Lakes are accessible from Highway 2 and Stevens Pass.

A segment of the Pacific Crest Trail leads from Snoqualmie Pass to Stevens Pass and includes the Kendall Catwalk on Kendall Peak. This exposed section should not be attempted in snowy or icy conditions.

== Notable mountains ==
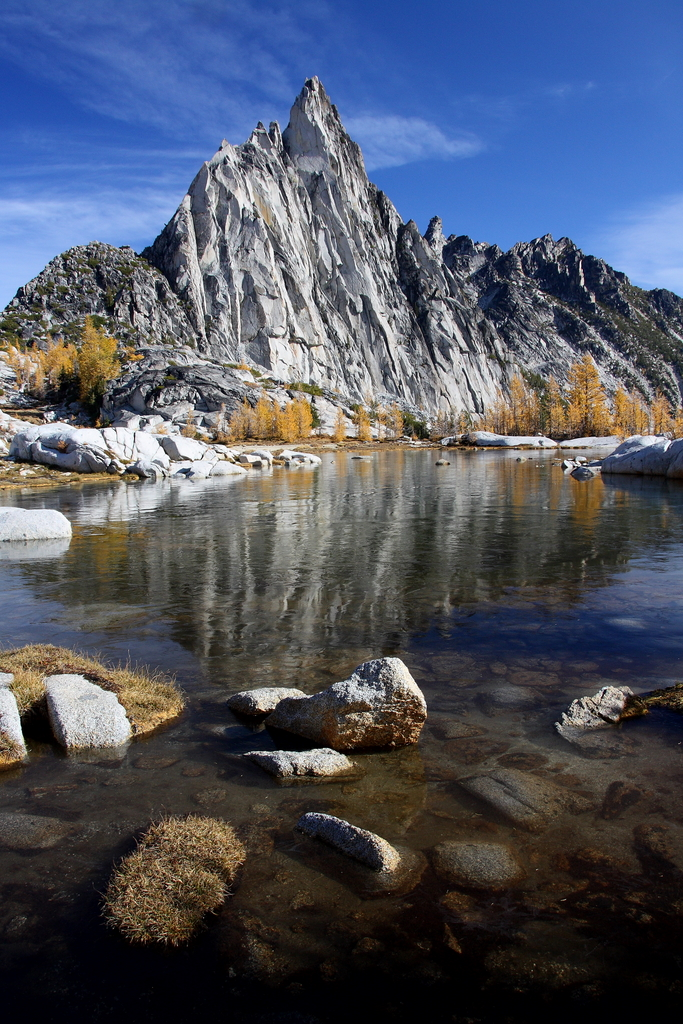
Gnome Tarn and Prusik Peak in The Enchantments.

Notable mountains and ranges in the wilderness include:

- Chiwaukum Mountains
- Mount Daniel — 7,960 feet (2,426 m), the highest point in King and Kittitas counties
- Mount Stuart — 9,415 feet (2,870 m), the highest point in the wilderness area
- Stuart Range
- Wenatchee Mountains

== Lakes ==
Notable lakes in the wilderness include:

- Enchantment Lakes
- Mason Lake
- Melakwa Lake
- Snoqualmie Lake

== See also ==
- Jack Creek Fire
