= Wright Mountain =

Mountain in Washington (state), United States

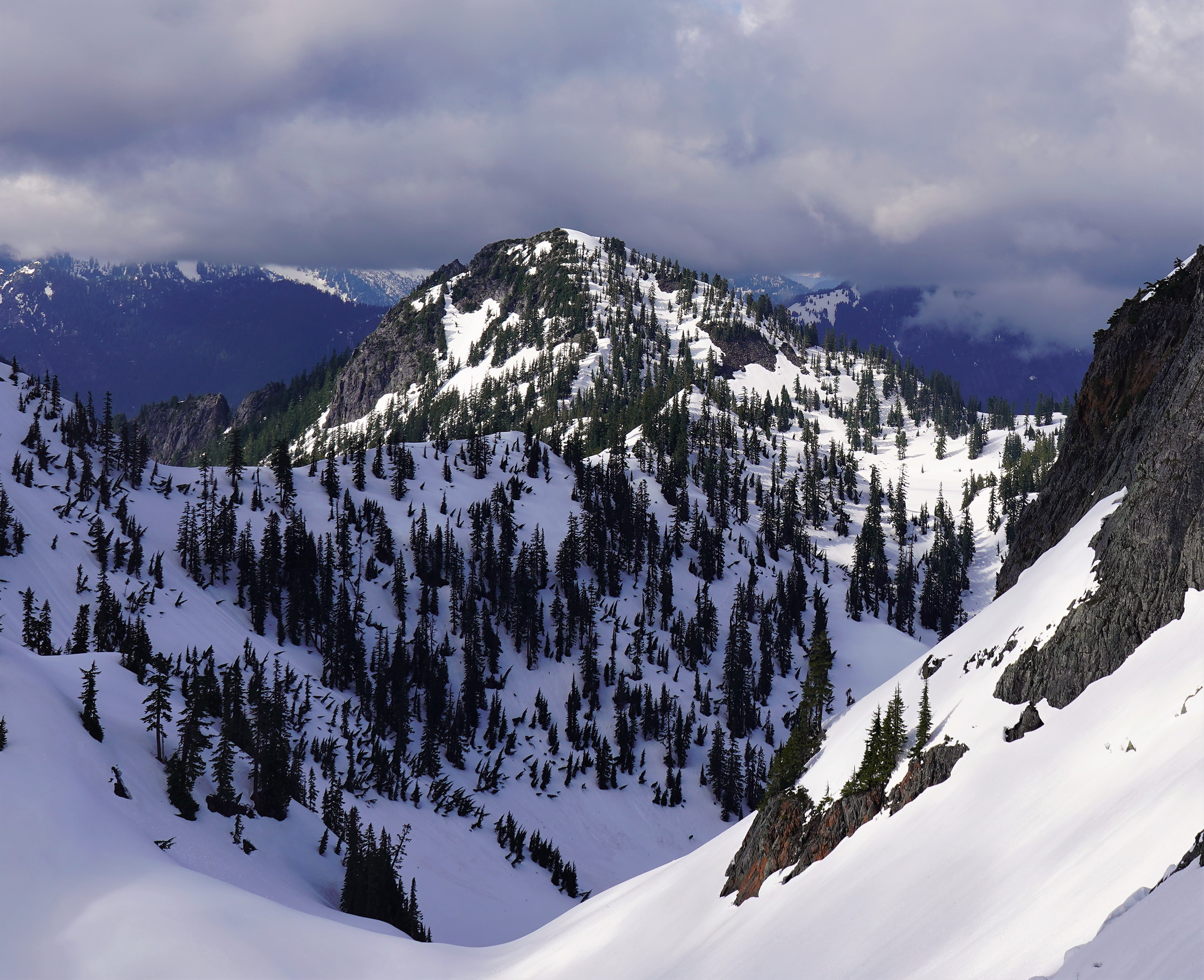
- South aspect, from Melakwa Pass

Highest point
- Elevation: 5,430 ft (1,660 m)
- Prominence: 470 ft (140 m)
- Parent peak: Kaleetan Peak (6,259 ft)
- Isolation: 0.81 mi (1.30 km)
- Coordinates: 47°28′47″N 121°28′04″W

Naming
- Etymology: George E. Wright

Geography
- Location within Washington (state) Location within the United States
- Country: United States
- State: Washington
- County: King
- Protected area: Alpine Lakes Wilderness
- Parent range: Cascade Range
- Topo map: USGS Snoqualmie Pass

Climbing
- Easiest route: Scrambling South slope

Wright Mountain is a 5,430-foot-elevation (1,660-meter) mountain summit located 11 mi (18 km) northwest of Snoqualmie Pass, in east King County of Washington state. It is part of the Cascade Range and is situated within the Alpine Lakes Wilderness, on land managed by Mount Baker-Snoqualmie National Forest. Wright Mountain is set above the northern shore of Gem Lake, and less than one mile north-northwest of Snow Lake. Neighbors within two miles include Kaleetan Peak, Chair Peak, and Mount Roosevelt, which is its nearest higher neighbor. Precipitation runoff from the mountain drains into tributaries of the Snoqualmie River. This mountain's name was officially proposed as Mount Wright in 1925 by The Mountaineers, and amended to Wright Mountain in 1968 by the U.S. Board on Geographic Names, to commemorate George E. Wright, a prominent Seattle attorney and mountaineer who was active in establishing Olympic National Park. Wright died October 9, 1923.

== Climate ==
Wright Mountain is located in the marine west coast climate zone of western North America. Most weather fronts originate in the Pacific Ocean, and travel northeast toward the Cascade Mountains. As fronts approach, they are forced upward by the peaks of the Cascade Range, causing them to drop their moisture in the form of rain or snowfall onto the Cascades (Orographic lift). As a result, the west side of the Cascades experiences high precipitation, especially during the winter months in the form of snowfall. During winter months, weather is usually cloudy, but, due to high pressure systems over the Pacific Ocean that intensify during summer months, there is often little or no cloud cover during the summer. Because of maritime influence, snow tends to be wet and heavy, resulting in high avalanche danger.

== Geology ==
The Alpine Lakes Wilderness features some of the most rugged topography in the Cascade Range with craggy peaks and ridges, deep glacial valleys, and granite walls spotted with over 700 mountain lakes. Geological events occurring many years ago created the diverse topography and drastic elevation changes over the Cascade Range leading to the various climate differences. These climate differences lead to vegetation variety defining the ecoregions in this area. The elevation range of this area is between about 1,000 feet (300 m) in the lower elevations to over 9,000 feet (2,700 m) on Mount Stuart.

The history of the formation of the Cascade Mountains dates back millions of years ago to the late Eocene Epoch. With the North American Plate overriding the Pacific Plate, episodes of volcanic igneous activity persisted. In addition, small fragments of the oceanic and continental lithosphere called terranes created the North Cascades about 50 million years ago.

During the Pleistocene period dating back over two million years ago, glaciation advancing and retreating repeatedly scoured the landscape leaving deposits of rock debris. The last glacial retreat in the Alpine Lakes area began about 14,000 years ago and was north of the Canada–US border by 10,000 years ago. The U-shaped cross section of the river valleys is a result of that recent glaciation. Uplift and faulting in combination with glaciation have been the dominant processes which have created the tall peaks and deep valleys of the Alpine Lakes Wilderness area.

== Gallery ==
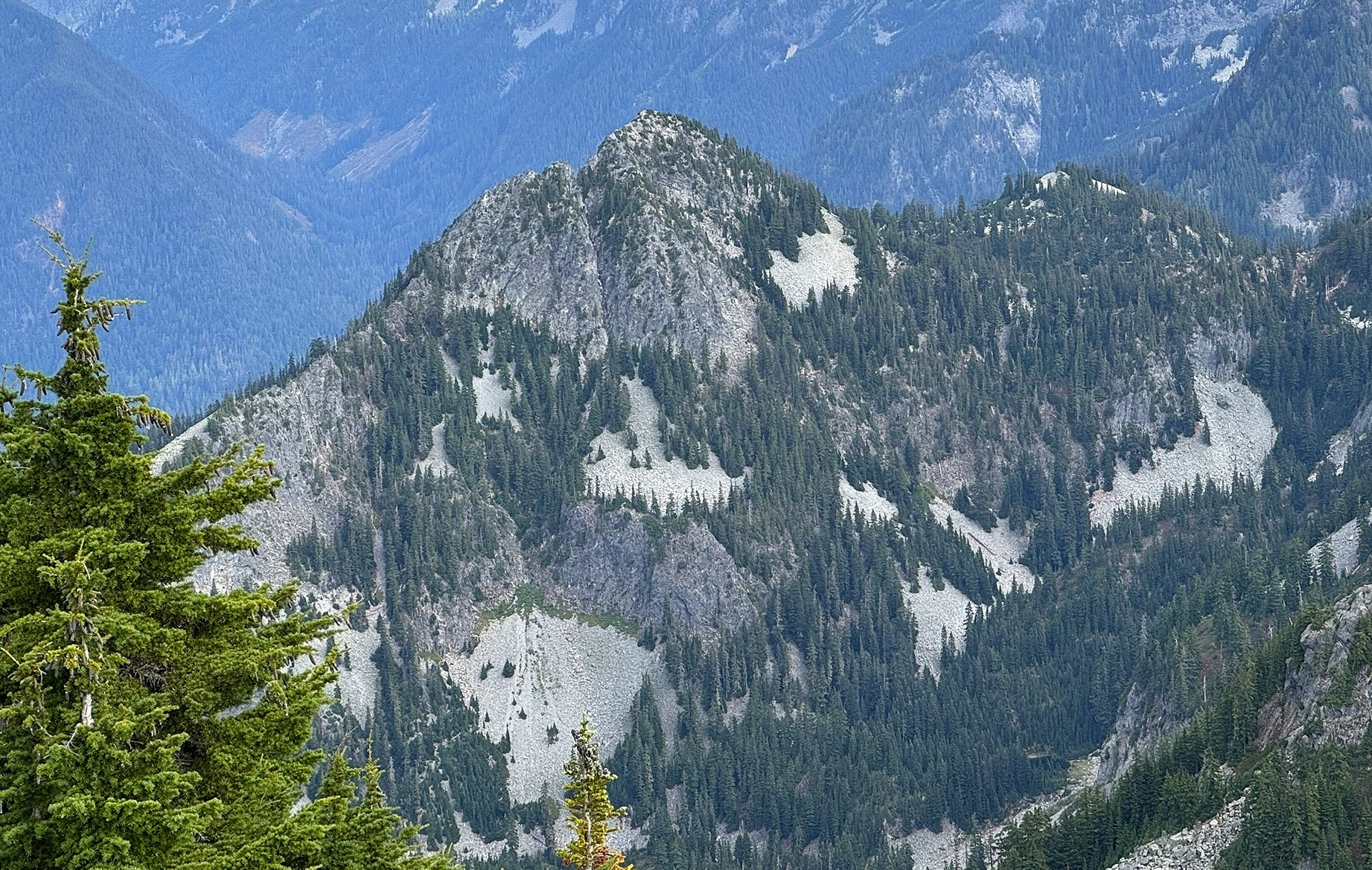
West aspect

== See also ==
- List of peaks of the Alpine Lakes Wilderness
- Geology of the Pacific Northwest
