= Mason Lake (King County) =

Lake in the Alpine Lakes Wilderness, Washington

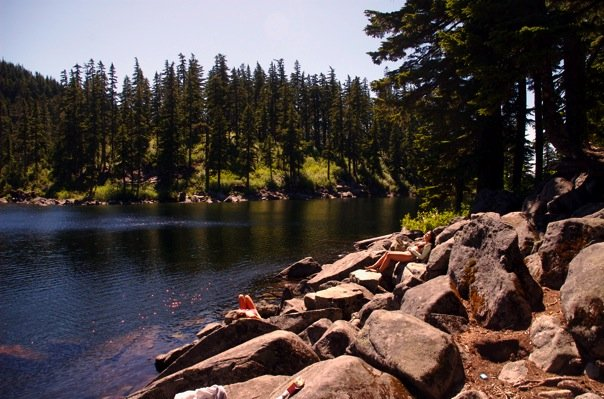

- Location within Washington (state) Location within the United States
- Location: King County, Washington, US, near Snoqualmie Pass
- Coordinates: 47°25′31.29″N 121°33′8.76″W
- Basin countries: United States
- Surface elevation: 4,183 ft (1,275 m)
- Islands: none

Mason Lake is a naturally occurring mountain lake located between Mount Defiance and Bandera Mountain near Snoqualmie Pass, King County, Washington. Accessible only by hike via the 3.4-mile-long (5.5 km) Mason Lake Trail (also known as "Ira Spring Memorial Trail"), splits to Mount Defiance trail while continuing past the Island Lakes towards Pratt Lake trail at Olallie Lake's north shore. Mason Lake is at an elevation of 4,200 feet (1,300 m)t.

== See also ==
- List of lakes of the Alpine Lakes Wilderness
