= Olallie Lake (King County, Washington) =

Lake in Washington state, U.S.

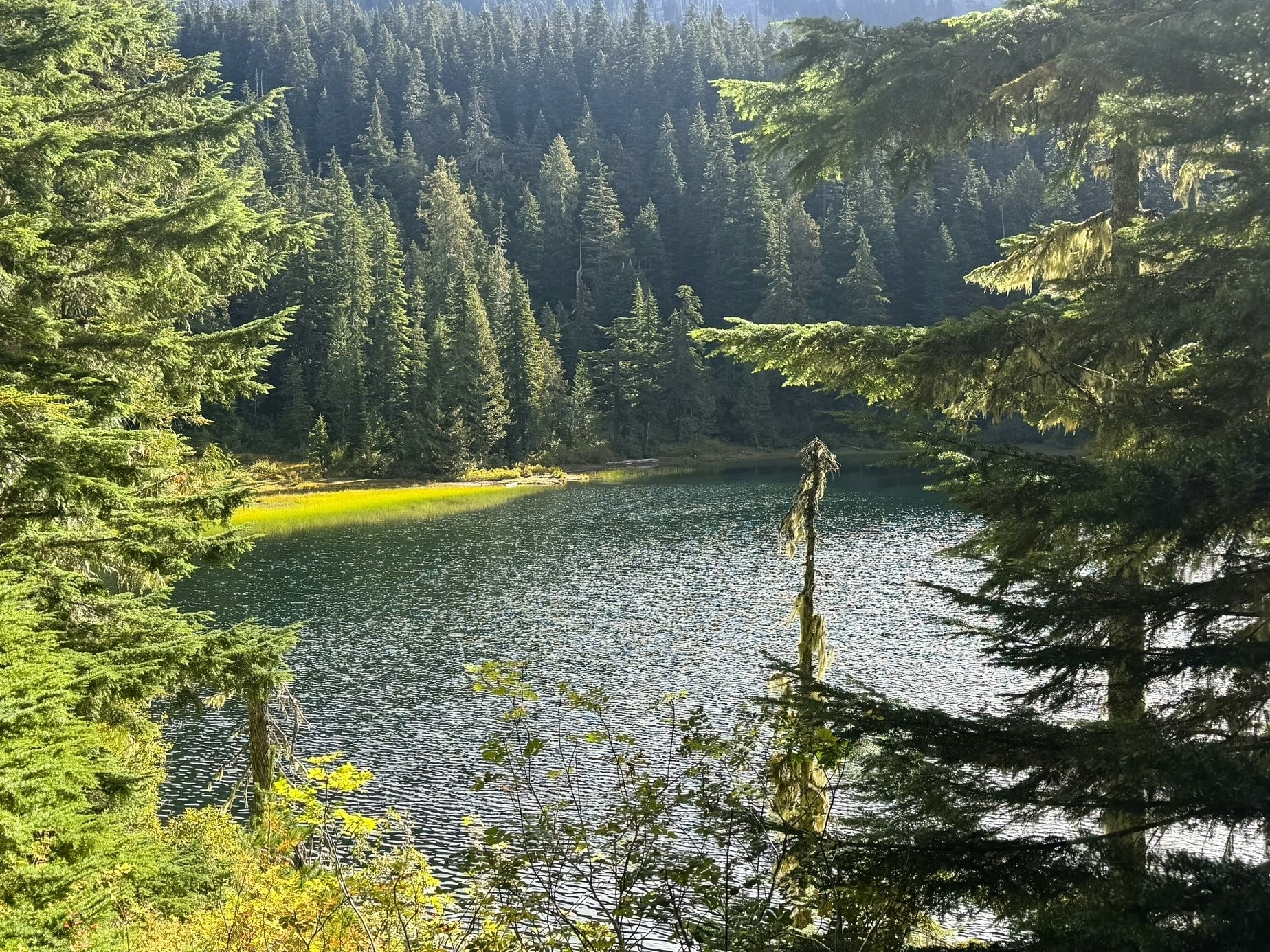

- Location within Washington (state) Location within the United States
- Location: King County, Washington, United States
- Coordinates: 47.422637°N 121.51039°W
- Basin countries: United States
- Surface area: 13.2 acres (5.3 ha)
- Surface elevation: 3,786 ft (1,154 m)

Olallie Lake is a freshwater lake located on a prominent valley at the western base of Pratt Mountain, between Mount Defiance and Bandera Mountain, in King County, Washington. The name means berry in Chinook Jargon.

Olallie Lake is surrounded by other alpine lakes, including Talapus Lake to the south and Pratt Lake a short distance north. Because of its proximity to Snoqualmie Pass and other prominent peaks in the Alpine Lakes Wilderness, the lakes are a popular area for hiking, swimming, and fishing rainbow trout.

== Access ==
Access to Olallie Lakes is through Mount Defiance Trail 1009, which is an offshoot of Pratt Lake Trail 1007. The trail splits north to Pratt Lake and west towards Island Lakes.

Access is also from Talapus Lake trail or Pratt Lake trail further east, a short exit from Interstate 90, west of the Snoqualmie Pass.

== See also ==
- List of lakes of the Alpine Lakes Wilderness
