= Pratt Lake (Washington) =

Lake in Washingtion state, U.S.

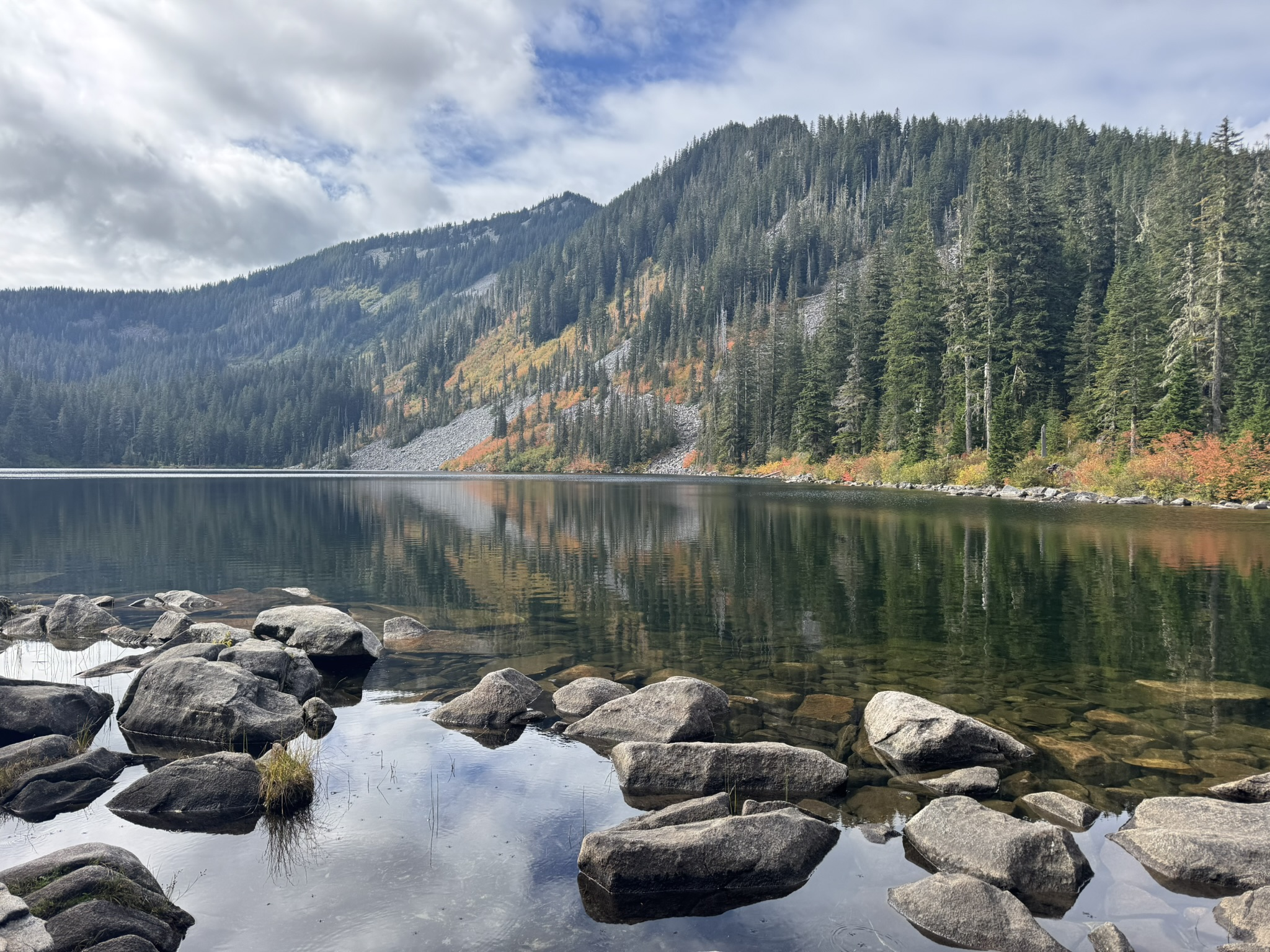

- Location within Washington (state) Location within the United States
- Location: King County, Washington, United States
- Coordinates: 47.435306°N 121.5131°W
- Basin countries: United States
- Surface area: 43.5 acres (17.6 ha)
- Surface elevation: 3,389 ft (1,033 m)

Pratt Lake, called Ollie Lake in older maps, is a freshwater lake located on a prominent valley at the eastern skirt of Pratt Mountain, in King County, Washington. Pratt Lake got its second name in 1917 from John W. Pratt, a member of the Mountaineers club.

Pratt Lake is surrounded by prominent peaks and other alpine lakes, including Olallie Lake and Talapus Lake a short distance south along Pratt Lake trail. Mount Defiance is a short distance to the west of Pratt Lake while Bandera Mountain is south on the north shore of Island Lakes.

Access to the lake is from Talapus Lake trail or Pratt Lake trail further east, a short exit from Interstate 90, west of the Snoqualmie Pass.

== See also ==
- List of lakes of the Alpine Lakes Wilderness
