= Talapus Lake =

Lake in Washington state, US

- Location within Washington (state) Location within the United States
- Location: King County, Washington, United States
- Coordinates: 47.415206°N 121.518626°W
- Primary outflows: Talapus Creek
- Basin countries: United States
- Surface area: 17.4 acres (7.0 ha)
- Surface elevation: 3,264 ft (995 m)

Talapus Lake is a freshwater lake located on a prominent valley at the eastern skirt of Bandera Mountain, in King County, Washington. Mount Defiance and Pratt Mountain are a short distance to the west of Talapus Lake. The name Talapus is a Chinook word for coyote.

Talapus Lake is surrounded by other alpine lakes, including Olallie Lake and Pratt Lake a short distance north. Because of its proximity to Snoqualmie Pass and other prominent peaks in the Alpine Lakes Wilderness, the lake is a popular area for hiking, swimming, and fishing rainbow trout.

Access to the lake is from Talapus Lake trail or Pratt Lake trail further east, a short exit from Interstate 90, west of the Snoqualmie Pass.

== See also ==
- List of lakes of the Alpine Lakes Wilderness
