= Island Lakes =

Lake in Washington state, U.S.

- Location within Washington (state) Location within the United States
- Location: King County, Washington, United States
- Coordinates: 47.424886°N 121.536858°W
- Basin countries: United States
- Surface area: 17 acres (6.9 ha)
- Surface elevation: 4,265 ft (1,300 m)

Island Lakes are a set of closely related freshwater lakes located on a prominent valley at the western base of Pratt Mountain, between Mount Defiance and Bandera Mountain, in King County, Washington. They include Island Lake proper, Rainbow Lake and Blazer Lake. They are themselves surrounded by other alpine lakes, including Lake Kulla Kulla and Mason Lake on the west side of the valley. Because of its proximity to Snoqualmie Pass and other prominent peaks in the Alpine Lakes Wilderness, the lakes are a popular area for hiking, swimming, and fishing rainbow trout. Access to Island Lakes is through Mount Defiance Trail 1009, which is an offshoot of Pratt Lake Trail 1007. The trail passes between Rainbow Lake and Blazer Lake on the north edge.

== Blazer Lake ==
Pratt Trail winds around Olallie Lake and heads west to Pratt Lake splitting south as the Mason Lake Trail. Blazer Lake is a 6.2 acres (2.5 ha) lake, located on the north edge of Mason Lake Trail, just west of the Rainbow Island outlet creek.

== Island Lake ==
Shortly before Rainbow Lake, the Mason Lake Trail splits south. Rainbow Lake is 17 acres (6.9 ha) and the larger of the Island Lakes situated east of Mason Lake, and is found a short distance from Rainbow Lake.

== Rainbow Lake ==
Rainbow Lake is 6 acres (2.4 ha) and located at the western base of Pratt Mountain, east of Mount Defiance. It is located on the south side of the Mason Lake Trail, shortly after it splits south towards Island Lake.

== See also ==
- List of lakes of the Alpine Lakes Wilderness
