= Chair Peak =

Mountain in Washington (state), United States

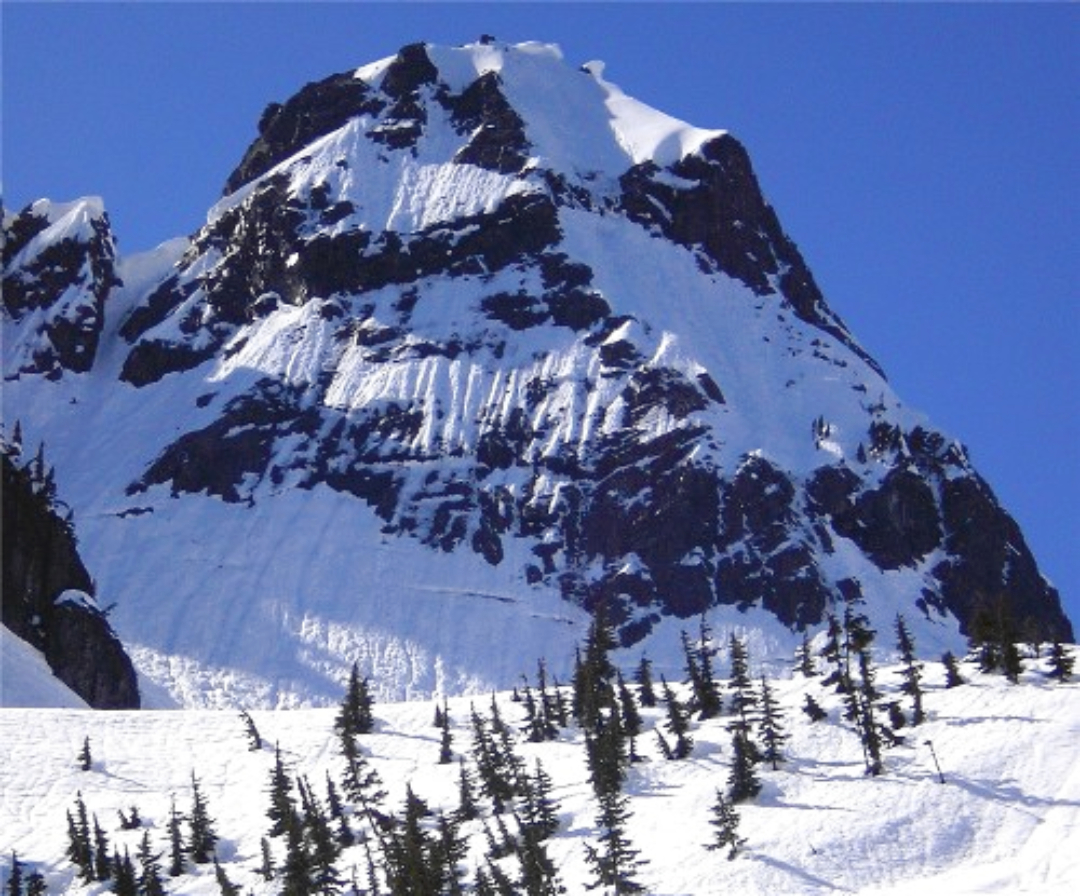
- Chair Peak southeast aspect

Highest point
- Elevation: 6,238 ft (1,901 m)
- Prominence: 878 ft (268 m)
- Parent peak: Kaleetan Peak (6,259 ft)
- Isolation: 0.57 mi (0.92 km)
- Coordinates: 47°27′35″N 121°28′01″W

Geography
- Location within Washington (state) Location within the United States
- Country: United States
- State: Washington
- County: King
- Protected area: Alpine Lakes Wilderness
- Parent range: Cascade Range
- Topo map: USGS Snoqualmie Pass

Climbing
- First ascent: 1913, Hec V. Abel and L.F. Curtis
- Easiest route: Scrambling

Chair Peak is a 6,238 ft (1,900 m) mountain summit located in east King County of Washington state. It's part of the Cascade Range and is set within the Alpine Lakes Wilderness. Chair Peak is situated three miles northwest of Snoqualmie Pass on land managed by Mount Baker-Snoqualmie National Forest. Precipitation runoff from this mountain drains into tributaries of the Snoqualmie River. Chair Peak is located immediately south of Snow Lake which is a popular hiking destination. Topographic relief is significant as the summit rises approximately 2,200 feet (670 m) above Snow Lake in 0.5 mi (0.80 km). The nearest higher neighbor is Kaleetan Peak, 0.57 miles (0.92 km) to the west-northwest.

== Climate ==
Chair Peak is located in the marine west coast climate zone of western North America. Most weather fronts originate in the Pacific Ocean, and travel northeast toward the Cascade Mountains. As fronts approach, they are forced upward by the peaks of the Cascade Range (orographic lift), causing them to drop their moisture in the form of rain or snowfall onto the Cascades. As a result, the west side of the Cascades experiences high precipitation, especially during the winter months in the form of snowfall. Because of maritime influence, snow tends to be wet and heavy, resulting in high avalanche danger. During winter months, weather is usually cloudy, but due to high pressure systems over the Pacific Ocean that intensify during summer months, there is often little or no cloud cover during the summer. The months July through September offer the most favorable weather for viewing or climbing this peak.

== Geology ==
The Alpine Lakes Wilderness features some of the most rugged topography in the Cascade Range with craggy peaks and ridges, deep glacial valleys, and granite walls spotted with over 700 mountain lakes. Geological events occurring many years ago created the diverse topography and drastic elevation changes over the Cascade Range leading to the various climate differences. These climate differences lead to vegetation variety defining the ecoregions in this area. The elevation range of this area is between about 1,000 feet (300 m) in the lower elevations to over 9,000 feet (2,700 m) on Mount Stuart.

The history of the formation of the Cascade Mountains dates back millions of years ago to the late Eocene Epoch. With the North American Plate overriding the Pacific Plate, episodes of volcanic igneous activity persisted. In addition, small fragments of the oceanic and continental lithosphere called terranes created the North Cascades about 50 million years ago.

During the Pleistocene period dating back over two million years ago, glaciation advancing and retreating repeatedly scoured the landscape leaving deposits of rock debris. The last glacial retreat in the Alpine Lakes area began about 14,000 years ago and was north of the Canada–US border by 10,000 years ago. The U-shaped cross section of the river valleys is a result of that recent glaciation. Uplift and faulting in combination with glaciation have been the dominant processes which have created the tall peaks and deep valleys of the Alpine Lakes Wilderness area.

== Gallery ==
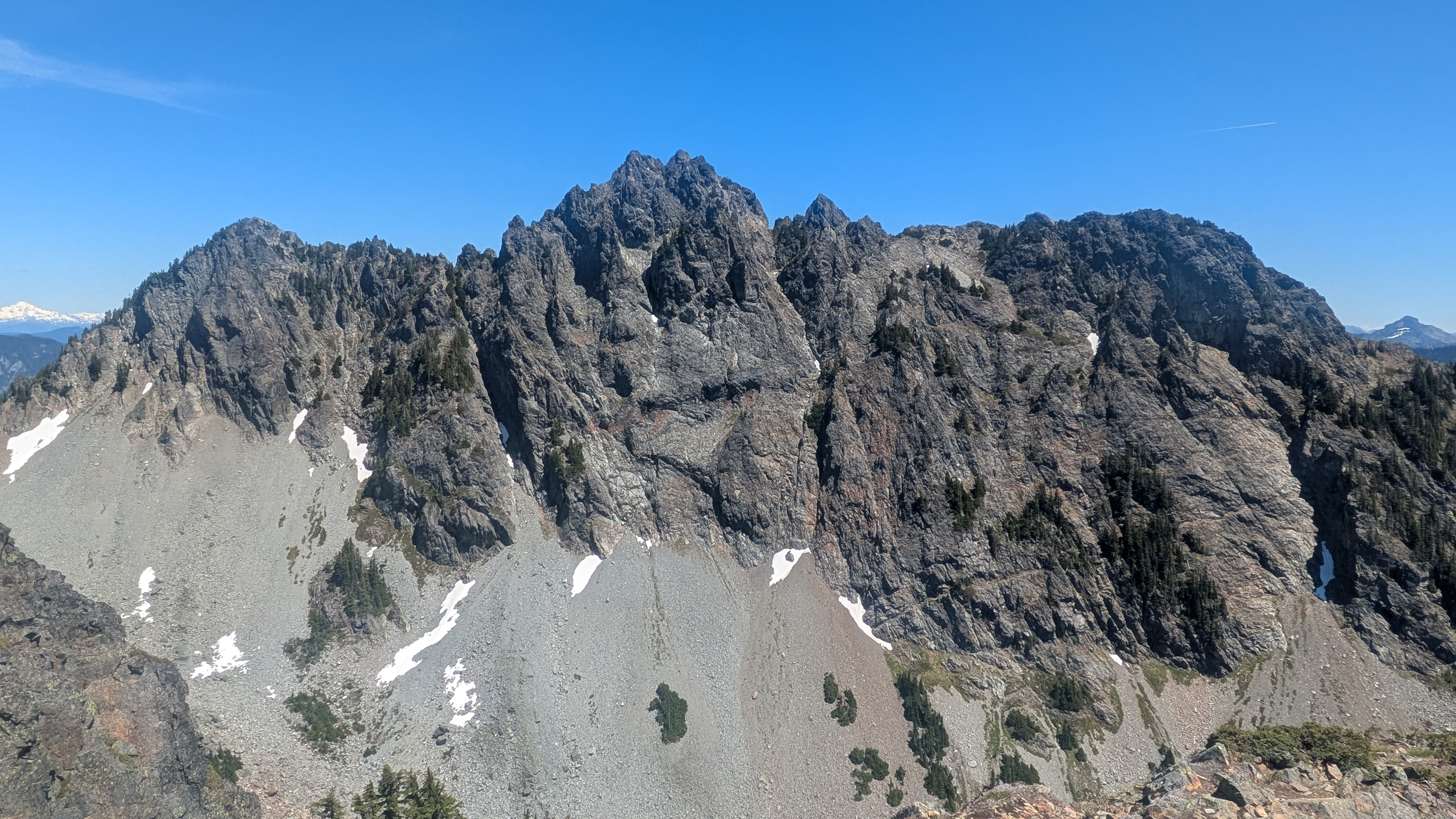
West aspect viewed from Kaleetan Peak

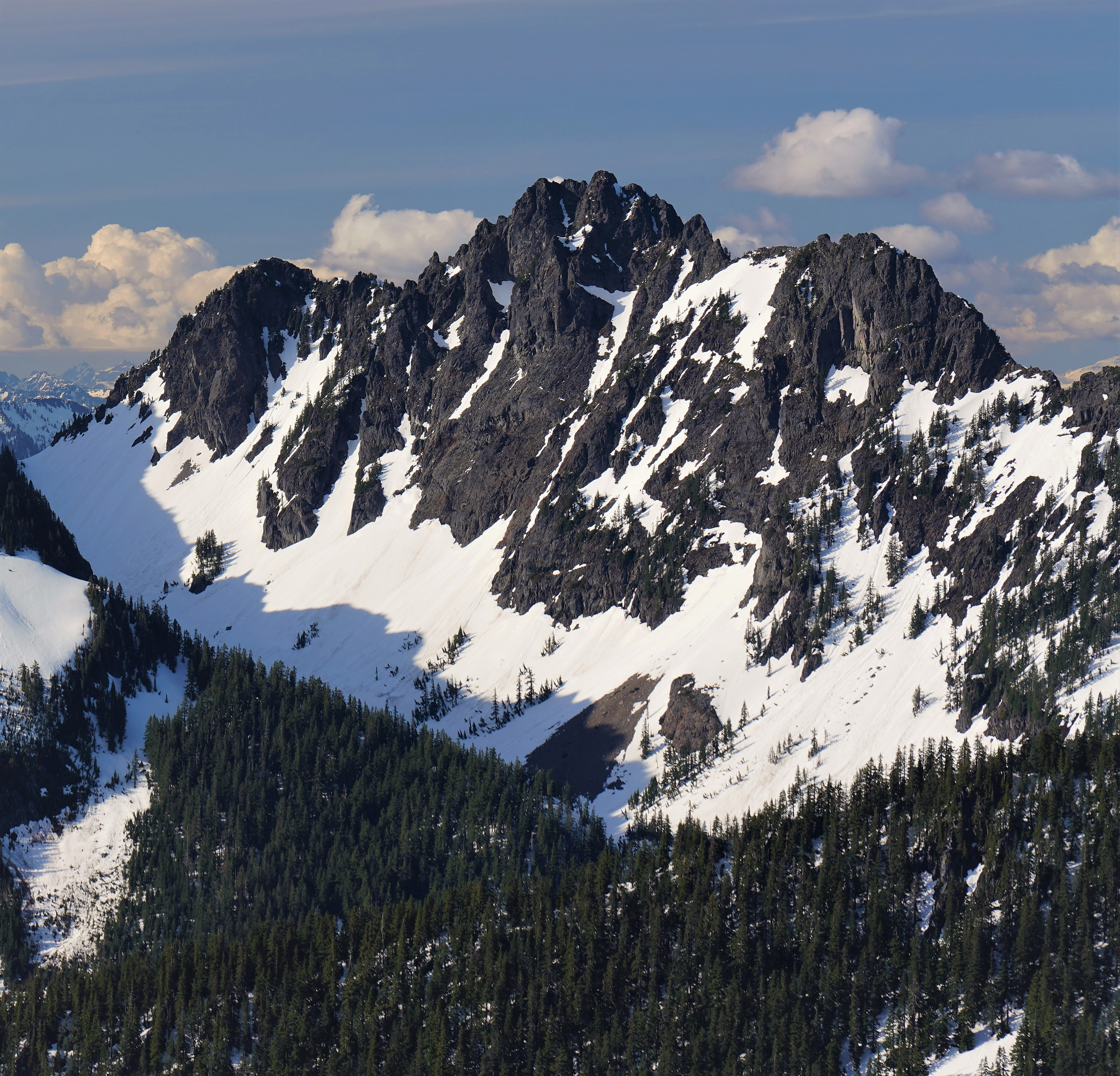
South aspect from Granite Mountain

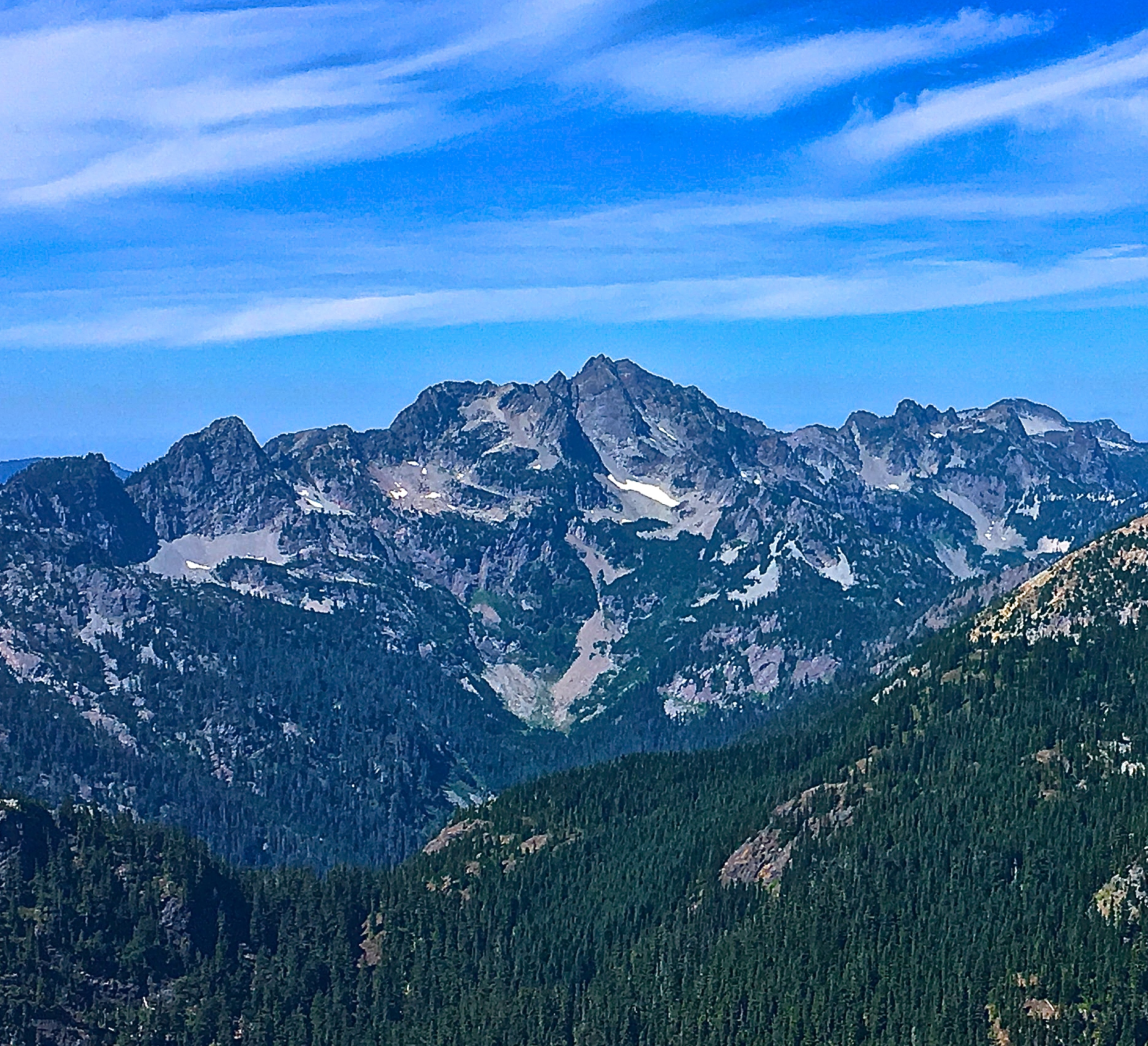
Chair Peak from Kendall Peak

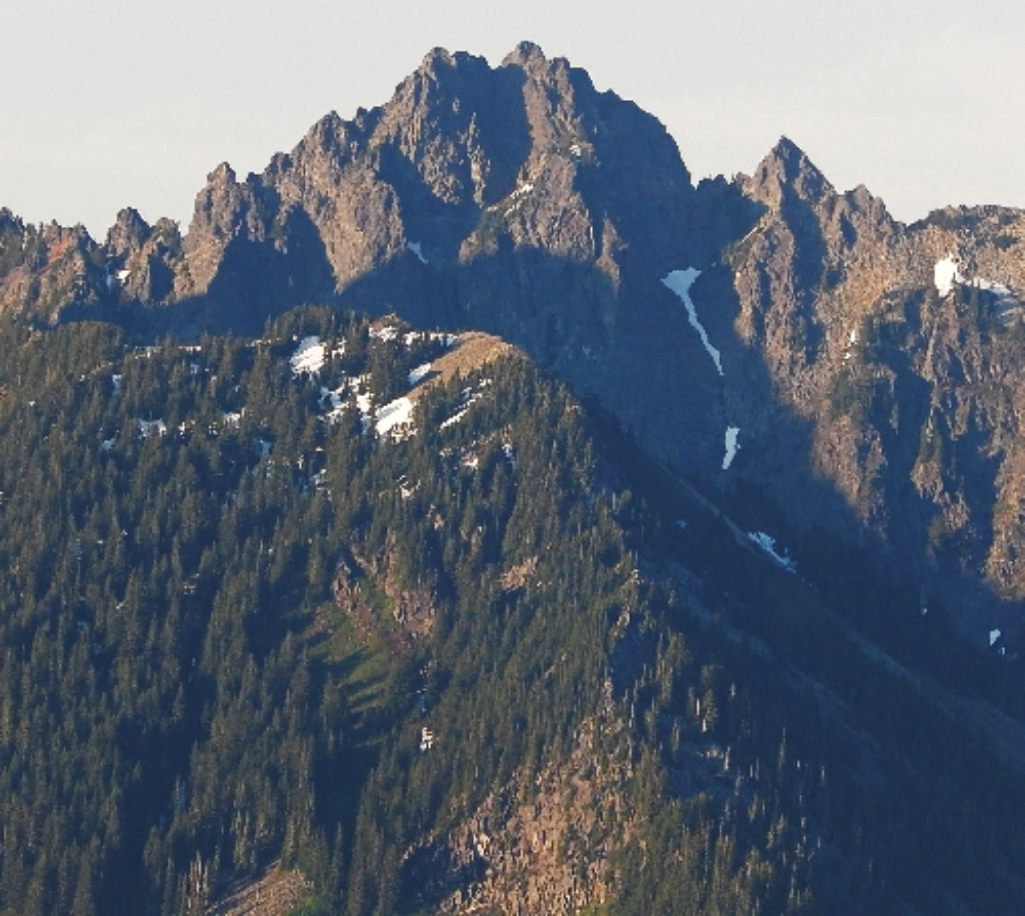
Chair Peak seen from Bandera Mountain

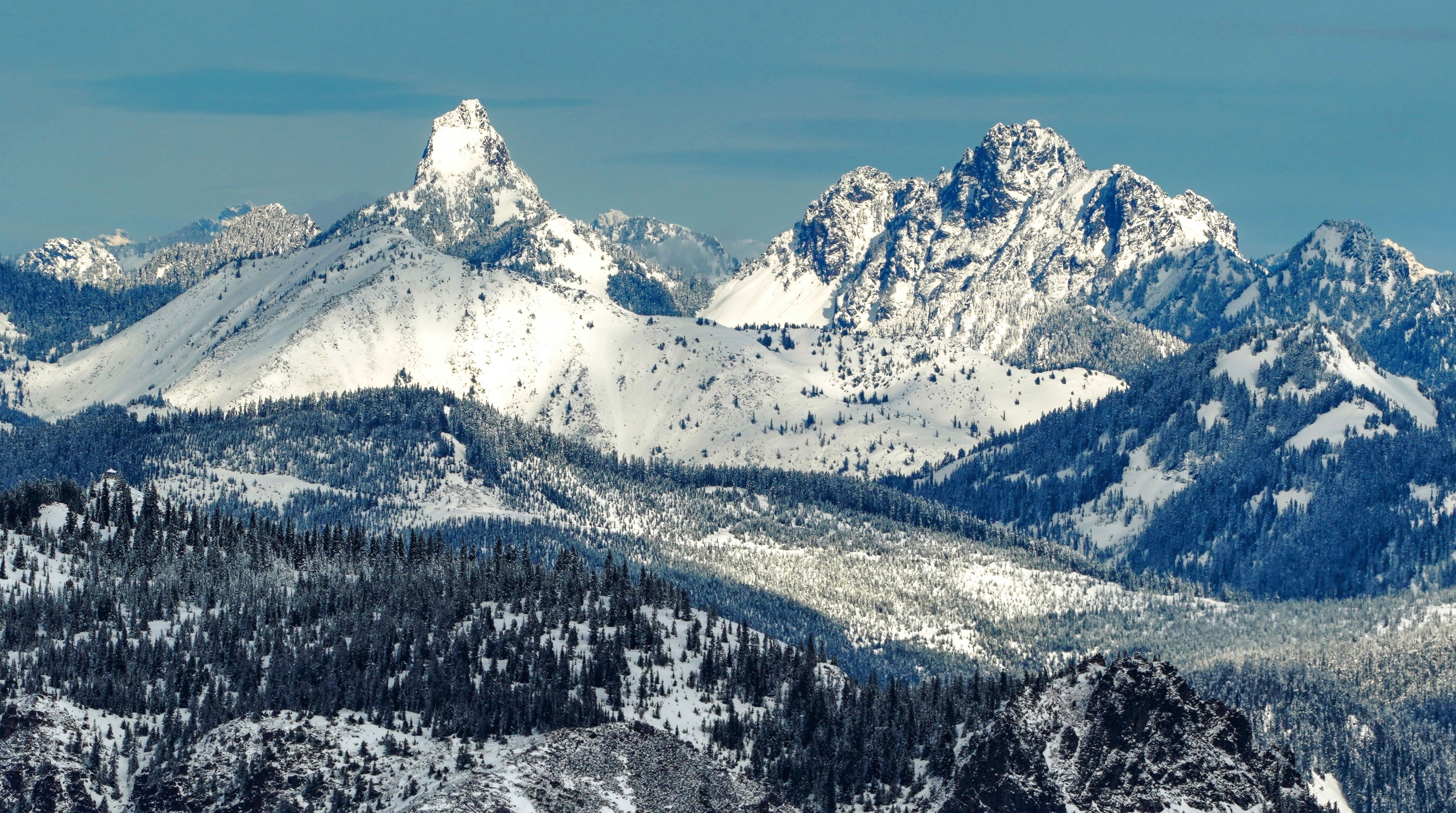
Kaleetan Peak (left) and Chair Peak (right) viewed from Noble Knob.

== See also ==
- List of peaks of the Alpine Lakes Wilderness
- Geography of Washington (state)
- Geology of the Pacific Northwest
