= Kaleetan Peak =

Mountain in Washington (state), United States

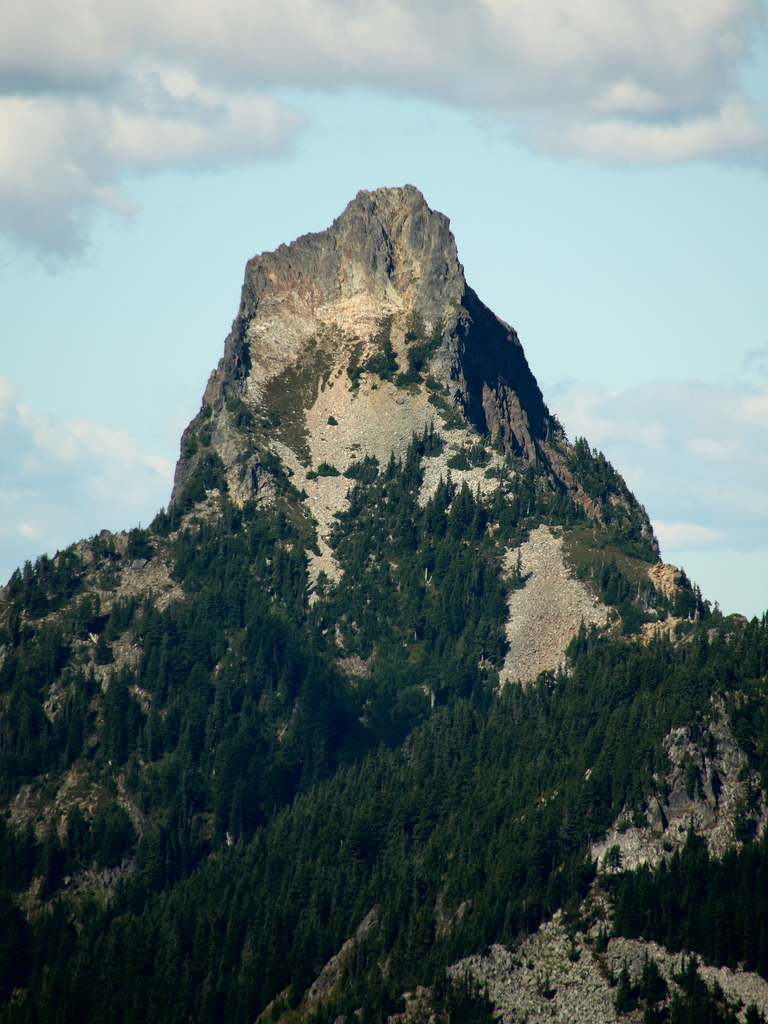
- Kaleetan Peak seen from Granite Mountain

Highest point
- Elevation: 6,259 ft (1,908 m)
- Prominence: 1,859 ft (567 m)
- Parent peak: Snoqualmie Mountain
- Isolation: 3.00 mi (4.83 km)
- Coordinates: 47°27′45″N 121°28′42″W

Geography
- Location within Washington (state) Location within the United States
- Country: United States
- State: Washington
- County: King
- Protected area: Alpine Lakes Wilderness
- Parent range: Cascade Range
- Topo map: USGS Snoqualmie Pass

Climbing
- First ascent: 1914, Sidney V. Bryant
- Easiest route: South Ridge; Scrambling class 3

Kaleetan Peak is a prominent 6,259-foot (1,908-metre) mountain summit located in King County of Washington state. It's part of the Cascade Range and is situated four miles northwest of Snoqualmie Pass. Kaleetan Peak is set within the Alpine Lakes Wilderness on land managed by Mount Baker-Snoqualmie National Forest. It's immediately west of Melakwa Pass and Chair Peak, and north of Melakwa Lake. Precipitation runoff from the mountain drains into tributaries of the Snoqualmie River. Topographic relief is significant as the summit rises approximately 2,400 feet (730 m) above Kaleetan Lake in 0.6 mi (0.97 km). The nearest higher peak is Snoqualmie Mountain, 2.89 miles (4.65 km) to the east. The mountain's name "Kaleetan" derives from Chinook Jargon which means "arrow". The peak was named by members of The Mountaineers and the toponym was officially adopted in 1916 by the U.S. Board on Geographic Names.

== Climate ==
Kaleetan Peak is located in the marine west coast climate zone of western North America. Most weather fronts originate in the Pacific Ocean, and travel northeast toward the Cascade Mountains. As fronts approach, they are forced upward by the peaks of the Cascade Range (orographic lift), causing them to drop their moisture in the form of rain or snowfall onto the Cascades. As a result, the west side of the Cascades experiences high precipitation, especially during the winter months in the form of snowfall. During winter months, weather is usually cloudy, but due to high pressure systems over the Pacific Ocean that intensify during summer months, there is often little or no cloud cover during the summer. Because of maritime influence, snow tends to be wet and heavy, resulting in high avalanche danger. The months July through September offer the most favorable weather for viewing or climbing this peak.

== Geology ==
The Alpine Lakes Wilderness features some of the most rugged topography in the Cascade Range with craggy peaks and ridges, deep glacial valleys, and granite walls spotted with over 700 mountain lakes. Geological events occurring many years ago created the diverse topography and drastic elevation changes over the Cascade Range leading to the various climate differences. These climate differences lead to vegetation variety defining the ecoregions in this area. The elevation range of this area is between about 1,000 feet (300 m) in the lower elevations to over 9,000 feet (2,700 m) on Mount Stuart.

The history of the formation of the Cascade Mountains dates back millions of years ago to the late Eocene Epoch. With the North American Plate overriding the Pacific Plate, episodes of volcanic igneous activity persisted. In addition, small fragments of the oceanic and continental lithosphere called terranes created the North Cascades about 50 million years ago.

During the Pleistocene period dating back over two million years ago, glaciation advancing and retreating repeatedly scoured the landscape leaving deposits of rock debris. The last glacial retreat in the Alpine Lakes area began about 14,000 years ago and was north of the Canada–US border by 10,000 years ago. The U-shaped cross section of the river valleys is a result of that recent glaciation. Uplift and faulting in combination with glaciation have been the dominant processes which have created the tall peaks and deep valleys of the Alpine Lakes Wilderness area.

== Gallery ==
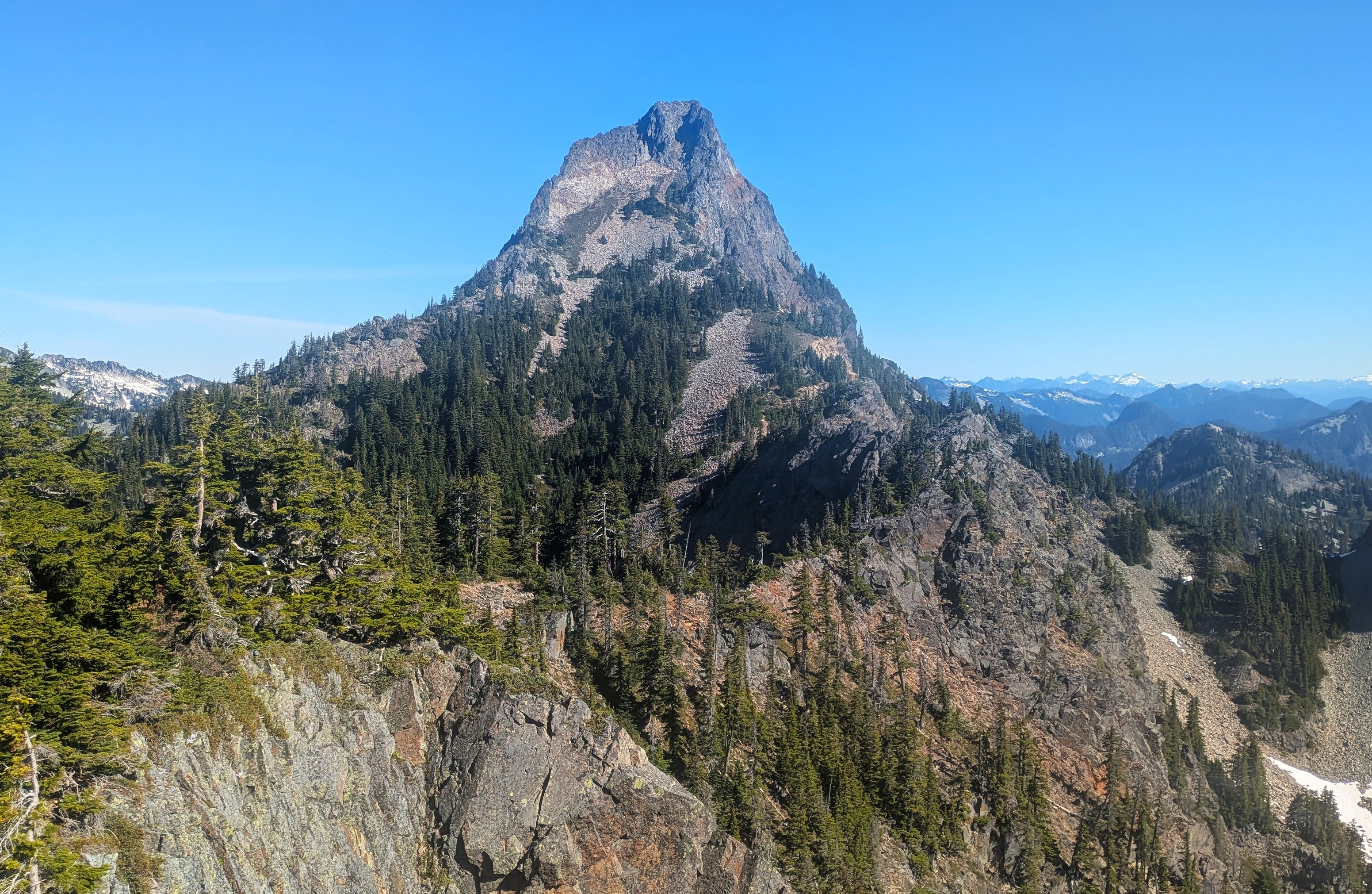
South aspect

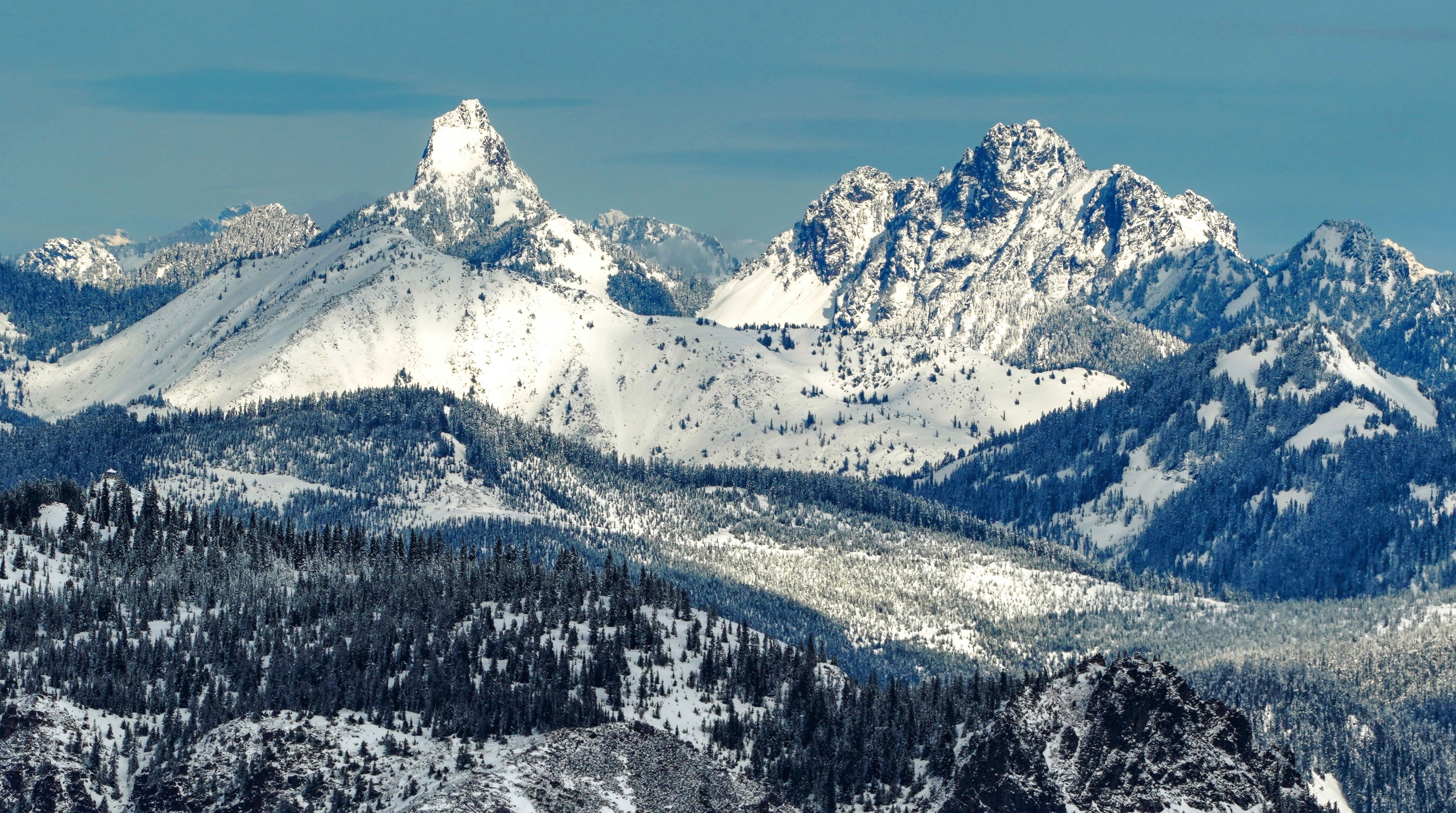
Kaleetan Peak (left) and Chair Peak (right) seen from Noble Knob.

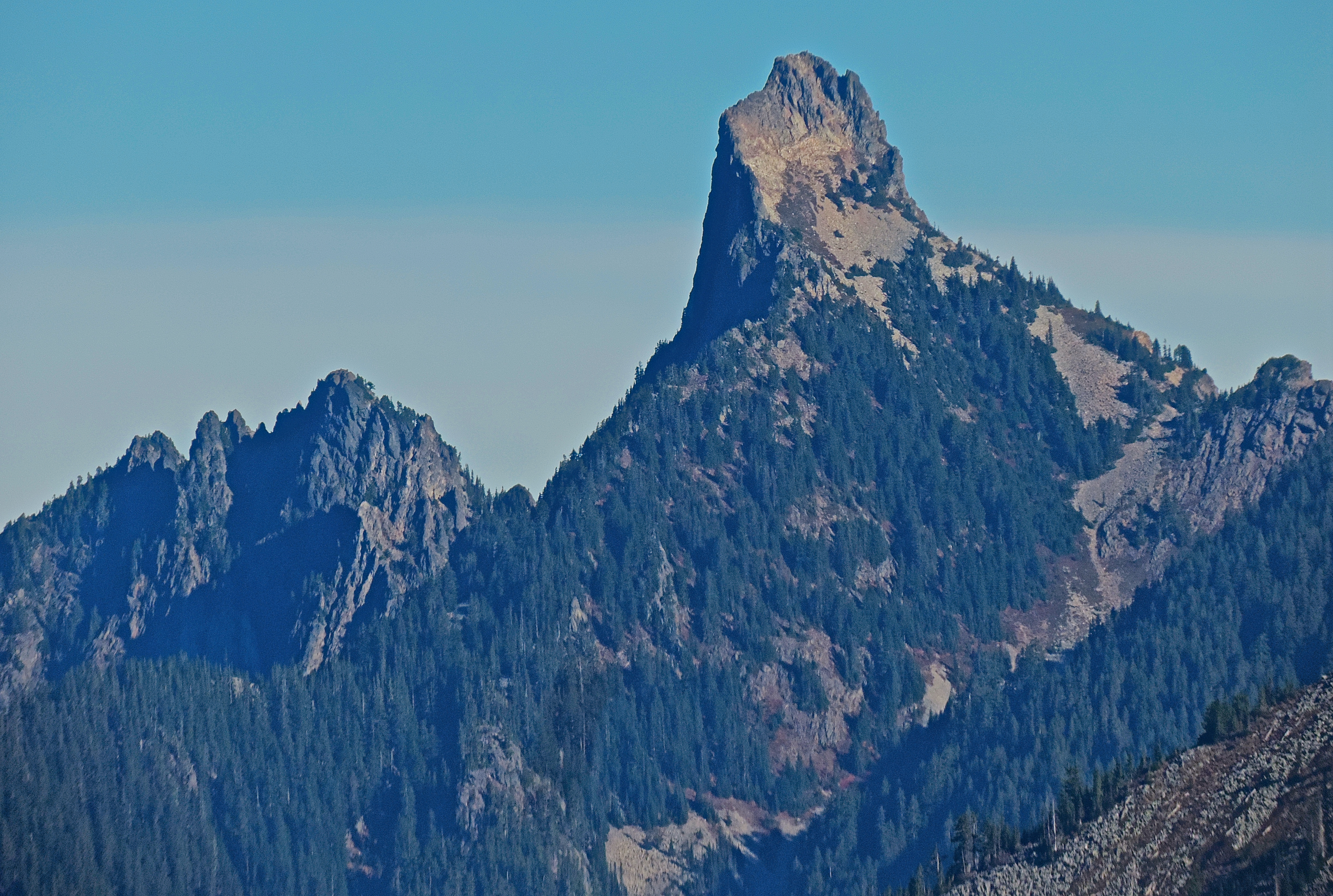
Kaleetan Peak with Mount Roosevelt (left)

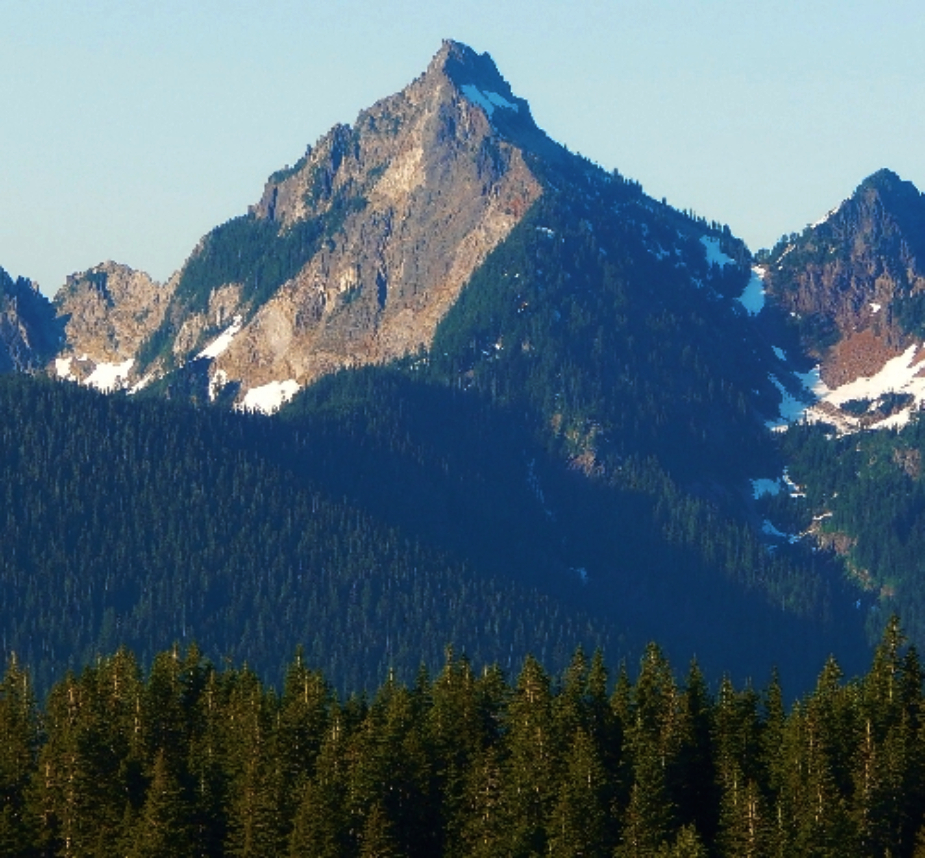
Kaleetan Peak seen from Bandera Mountain

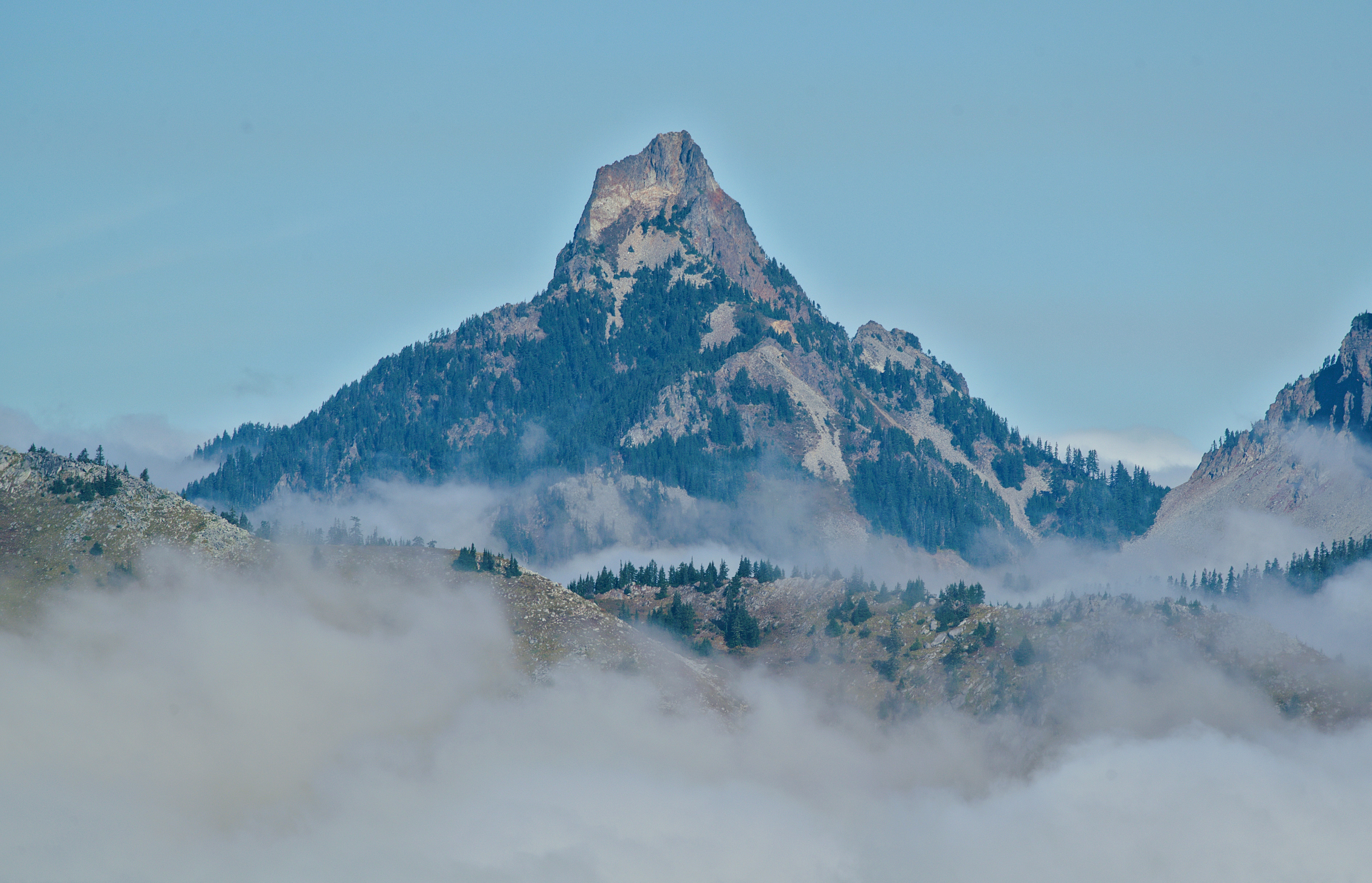
Kaleetan Peak viewed from Abiel Peak

== See also ==
- List of peaks of the Alpine Lakes Wilderness
- Geography of Washington (state)
- Geology of the Pacific Northwest
