= Snow Lake (King County, Washington) =

Lake in the Alpine Lakes Wilderness, Washington, United States

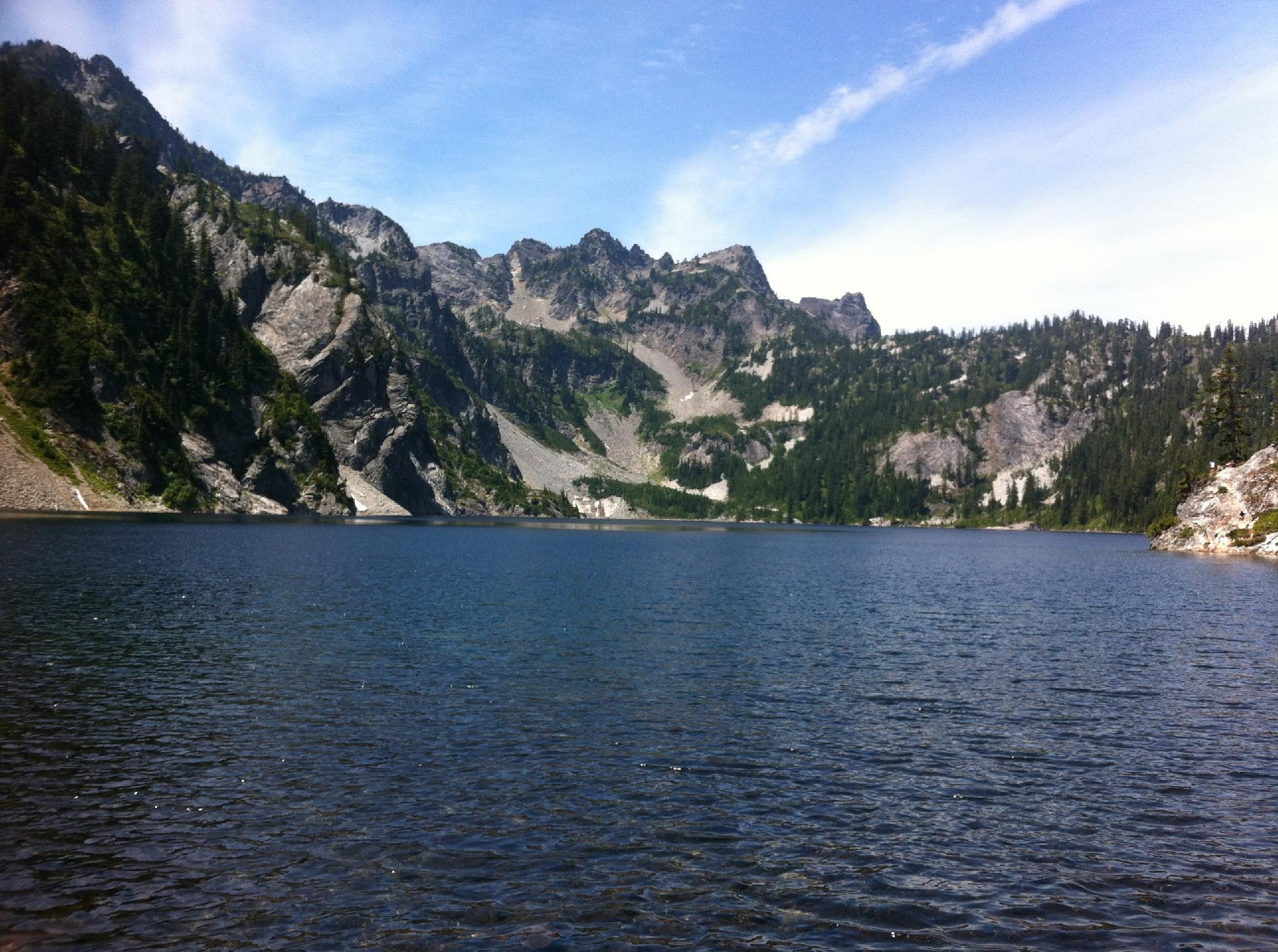
- Snow Lake from eastern shore (Mount Roosevelt centered)

- Location within Washington (state) Location within the United States
- Location: King County, Washington
- Coordinates: 47°28′1″N 121°27′20″W
- Primary inflows: Rock Creek (from Gem Lake)
- Primary outflows: Rock Creek
- Basin countries: United States
- Surface area: 152.9 acres (61.9 ha)
- Surface elevation: 4,019 ft (1,225 m)
- Islands: 0

Snow Lake is located in King County, Washington. The lake is the "most visited lake in the Alpine Lakes Wilderness." The lake is also stocked with rainbow trout for fishing.

The ruins of a cabin from 1930 exist near the lake, having collapsed in 1950 due to snow.

Camping is available via forest service permit. Hikers can continue onwards to nearby Gem Lake or lower/upper Wildcat Lakes.

== Climate ==
Snow Lake has a hemiboreal climate. The average temperature is 3 °C. The warmest month is August, with an average temperature of 15 °C, and the coldest month is January, at an average of −6 °C. The average rainfall is 1,687 millimeters per year. The wettest month is December, with 247 millimeters of rain, and the least in July, with 33 millimeters of rain.

== Gallery ==
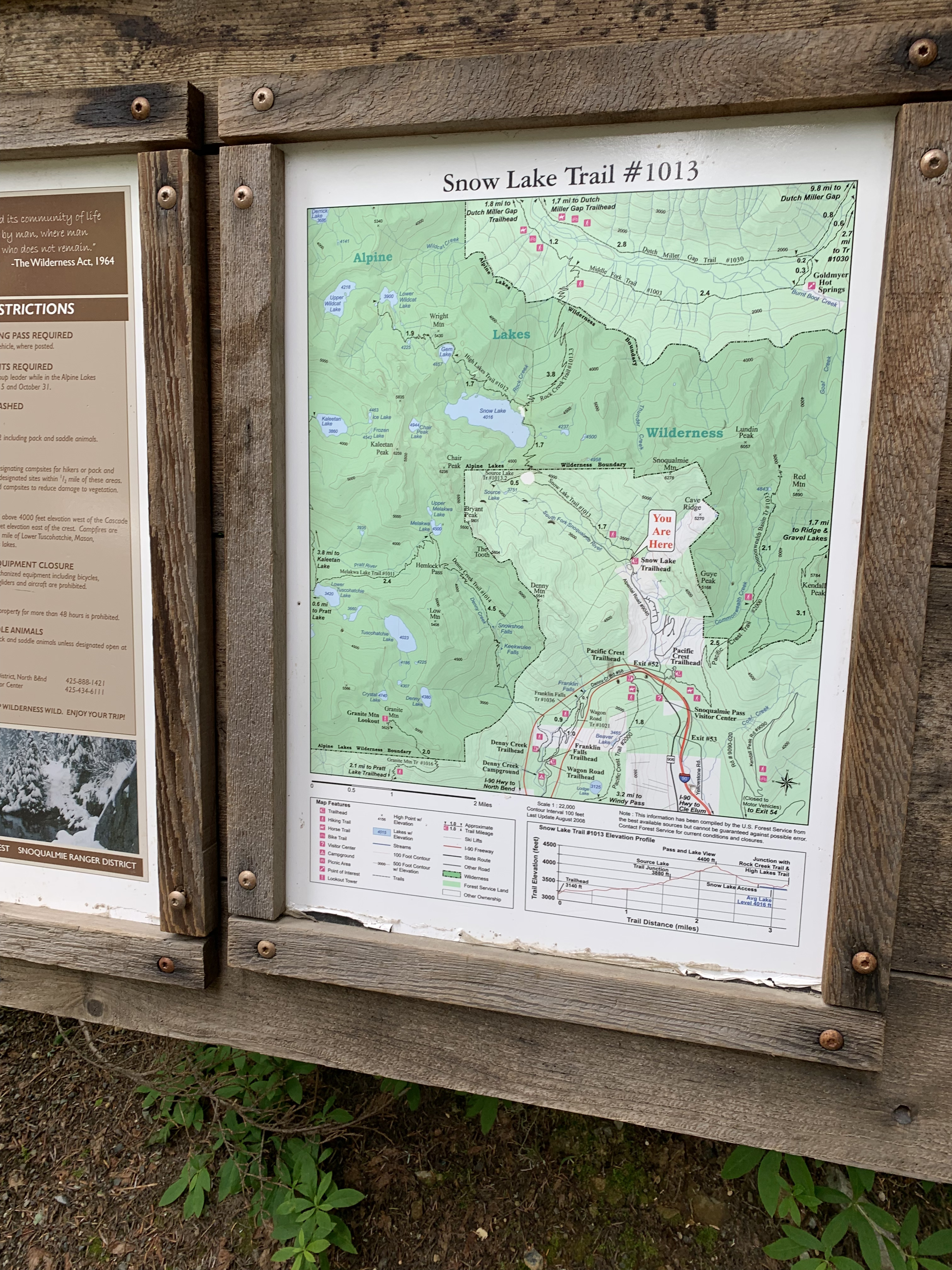
Snow Lake Trail map

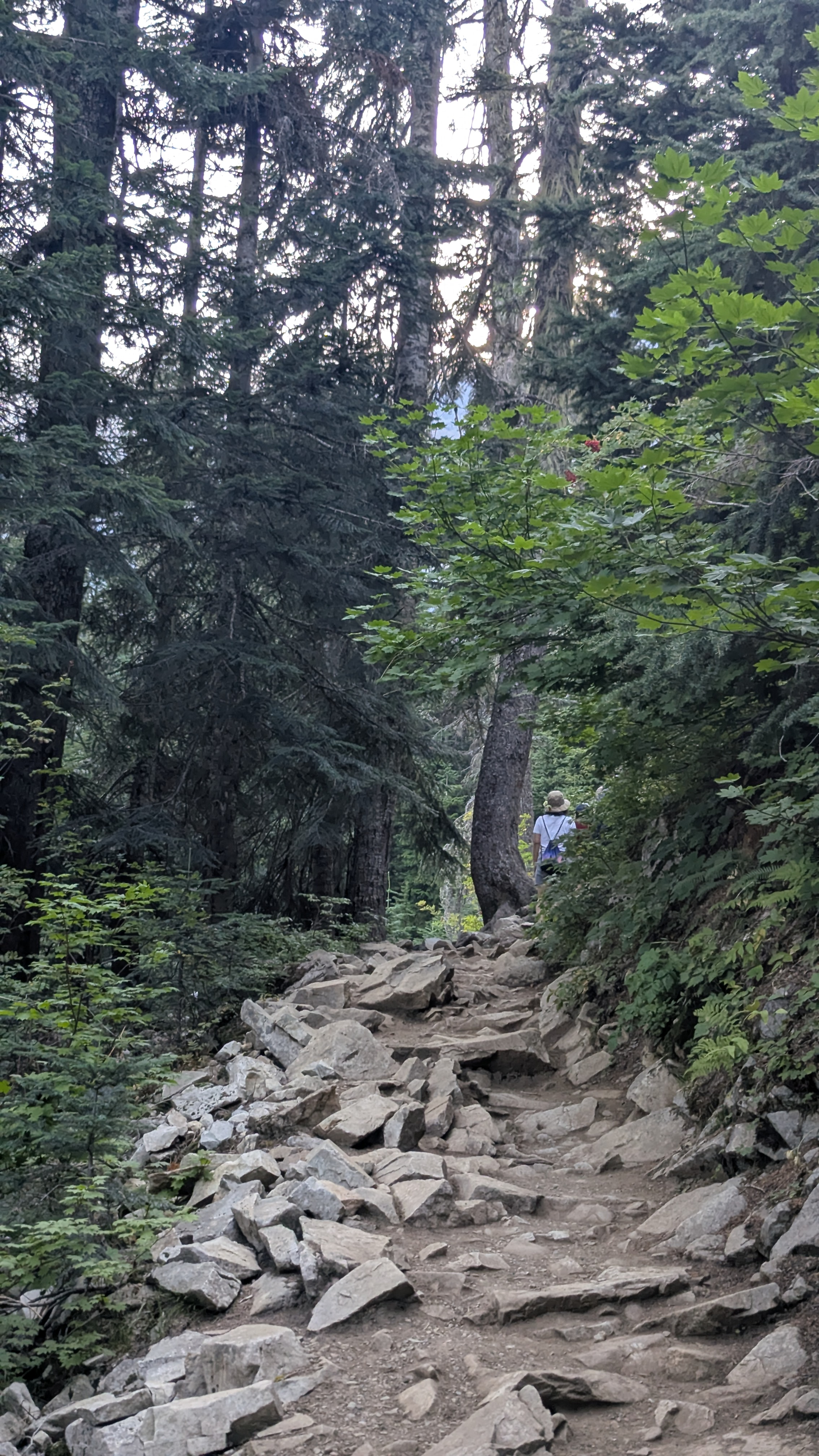
Trail to the lake

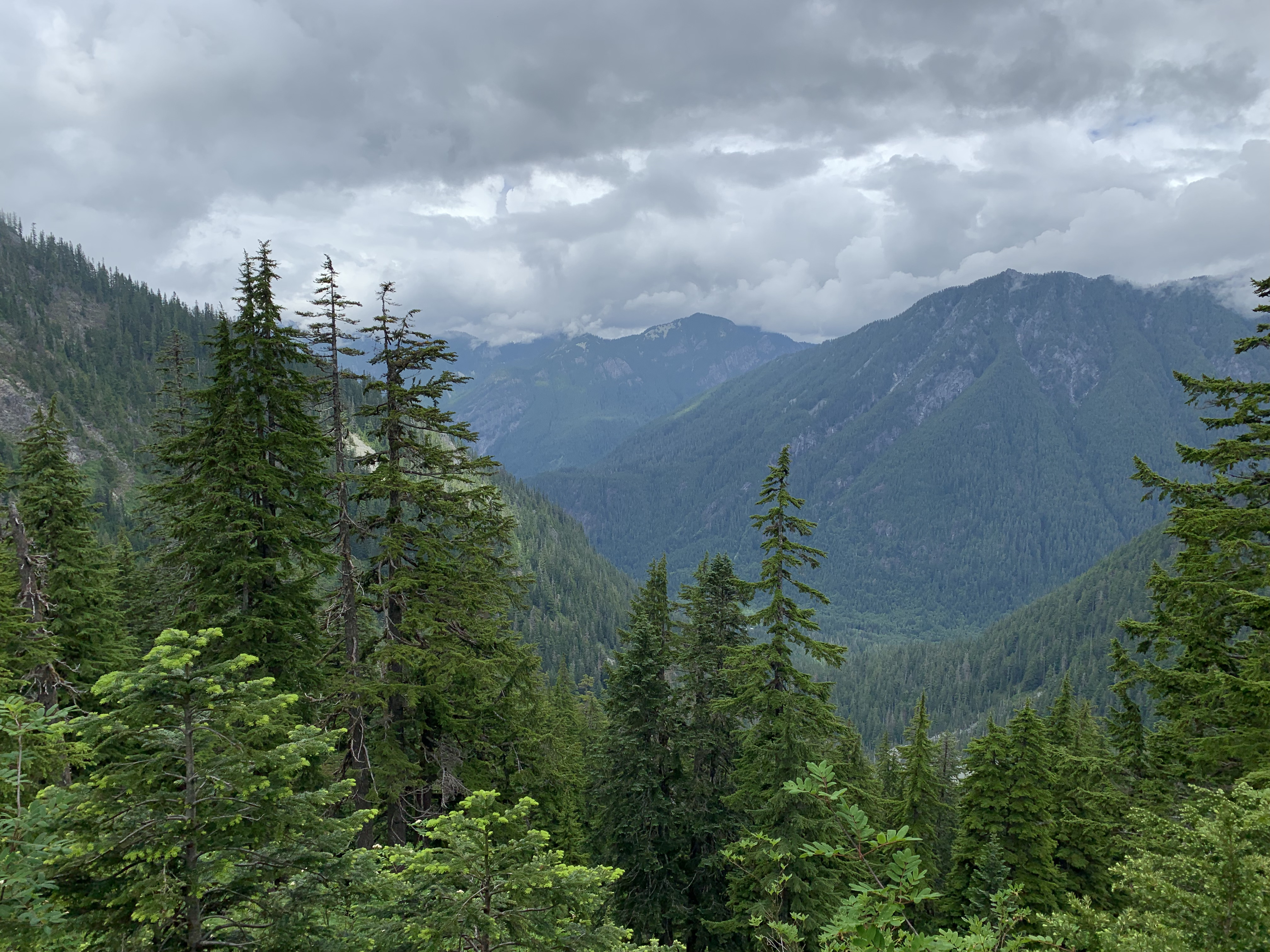
View from the trail on the way to the lake

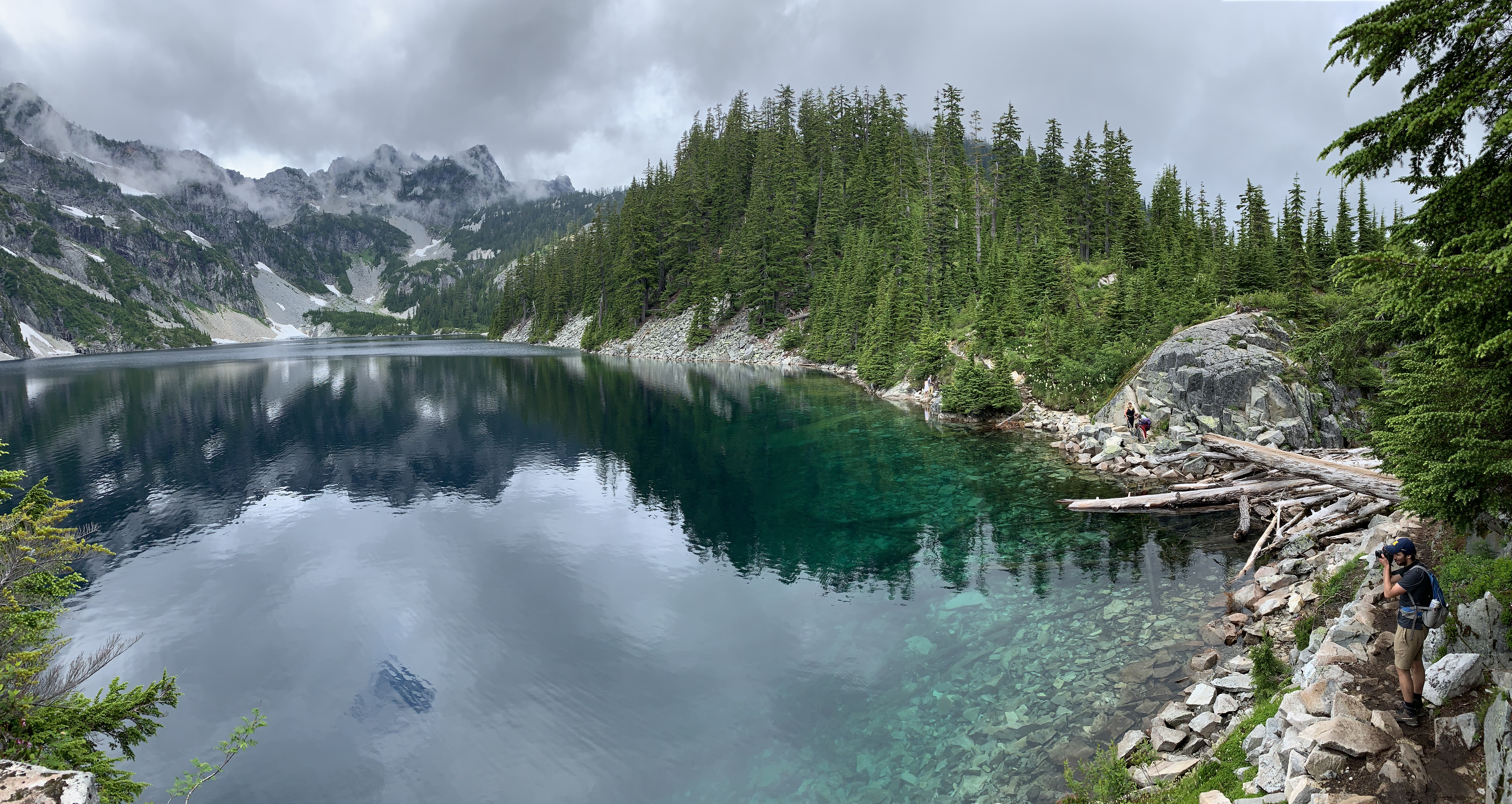
The lake in July 2020
