= Mount Defiance (Washington) =

Mountain in Washington (state), United States

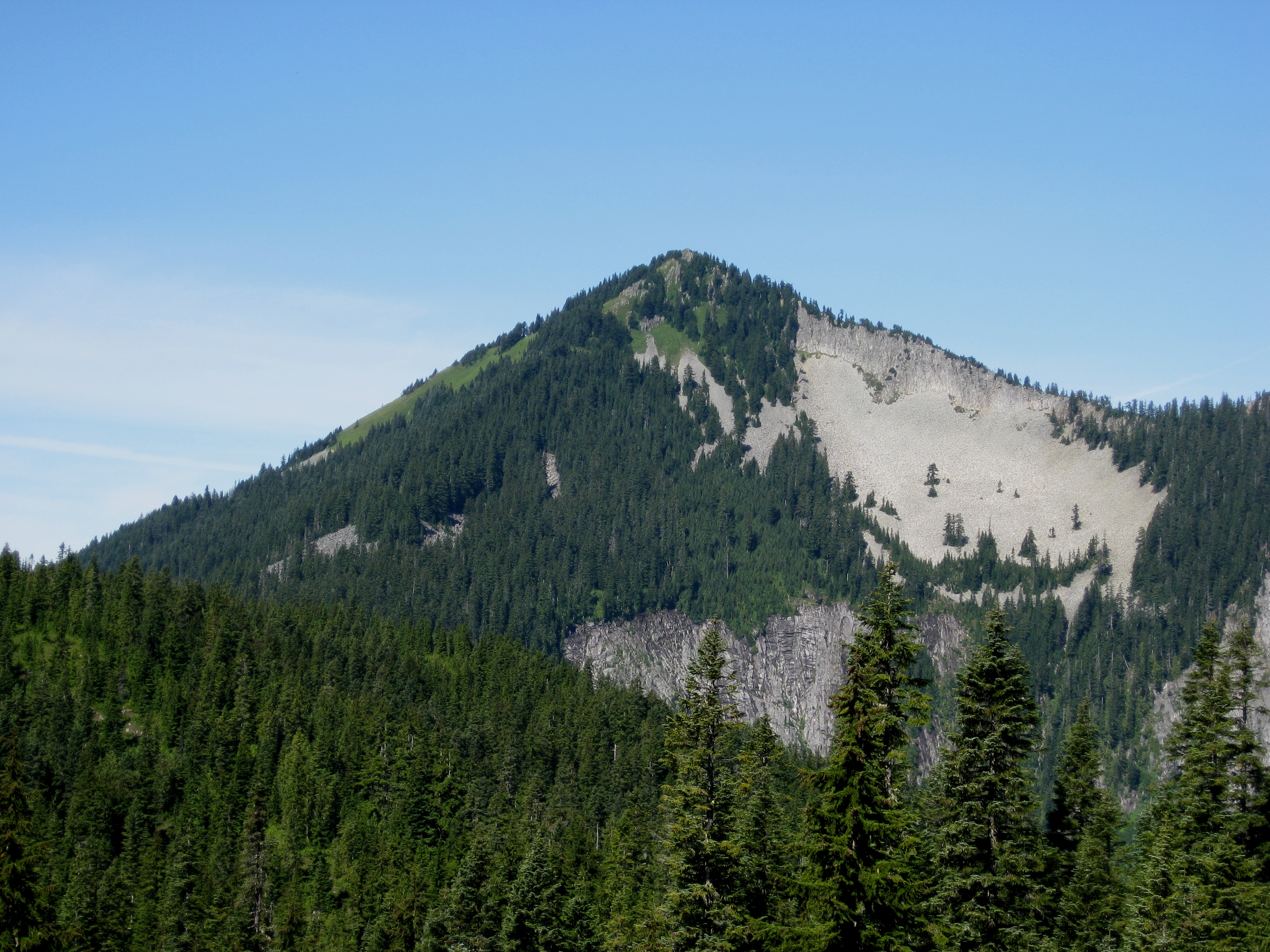
- Mount Defiance, east aspect

Highest point
- Elevation: 5,584 ft (1,702 m)
- Prominence: 1,424 ft (434 m)
- Parent peak: Granite Mountain (5,633 ft)
- Isolation: 4.06 mi (6.53 km)
- Coordinates: 47°26′07″N 121°33′52″W

Geography
- Location within Washington (state) Location within the United States
- Country: United States
- State: Washington
- County: King
- Protected area: Alpine Lakes Wilderness
- Parent range: Cascade Range
- Topo map: USGS Bandera

Climbing
- Easiest route: Hiking trail

Mount Defiance is a 5,584-foot (1,702-metre) mountain summit located in King County of Washington state. It is part of the Cascade Range and is within the Alpine Lakes Wilderness. Mount Defiance is situated 6.5 mi (10.5 km) west of Snoqualmie Pass on land managed by Mount Baker-Snoqualmie National Forest. Precipitation runoff on the mountain drains into tributaries of the Snoqualmie River. The nearest higher peak is Granite Mountain, 3.96 mi (6.37 km) to the east-southeast, and Bandera Mountain is 1.85 mi (2.98 km) to the southeast. Mount Defiance can be reached by trail, with access via the Ira Spring, Talapus Lake, or Pratt Lake trailheads.

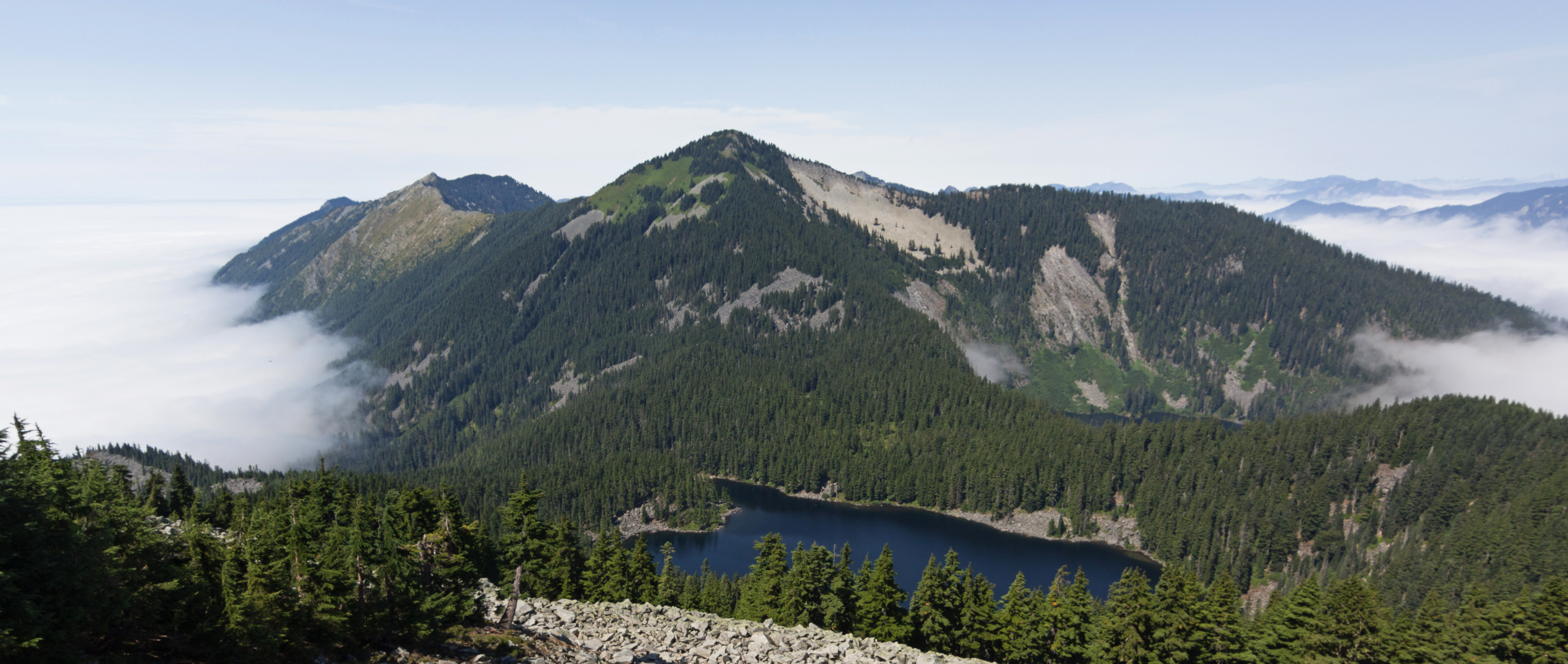
Mount Defiance and Mason Lake seen from Bandera Mountain

== Climate ==
Mount Defiance is located in the marine west coast climate zone of western North America. Weather fronts originating in the Pacific Ocean travel northeast toward the Cascade Mountains. As fronts approach, they are forced upward by the peaks of the Cascade Range, causing them to drop their moisture in the form of rain or snow onto the Cascades (Orographic lift). As a result, the west side of the Cascades experiences high precipitation, especially during the winter months in the form of snowfall. Because of maritime influence, snow tends to be wet and heavy, resulting in high avalanche danger. During winter months, weather is usually cloudy, but, due to high pressure systems over the Pacific Ocean that intensify during summer months, there is often little or no cloud cover during the summer.

== Geology ==
The Alpine Lakes Wilderness features some of the most rugged topography in the Cascade Range with craggy peaks and ridges, deep glacial valleys, and granite walls spotted with over 700 mountain lakes. Geological events occurring many years ago created the diverse topography and drastic elevation changes over the Cascade Range leading to the various climate differences. These climate differences lead to vegetation variety defining the ecoregions in this area. The elevation range of this area is between about 1,000 feet (300 m) in the lower elevations to over 9,000 feet (2,700 m) on Mount Stuart.

The history of the formation of the Cascade Mountains dates back millions of years ago to the late Eocene Epoch. With the North American Plate overriding the Pacific Plate, episodes of volcanic igneous activity persisted. In addition, small fragments of the oceanic and continental lithosphere called terranes created the North Cascades about 50 million years ago.

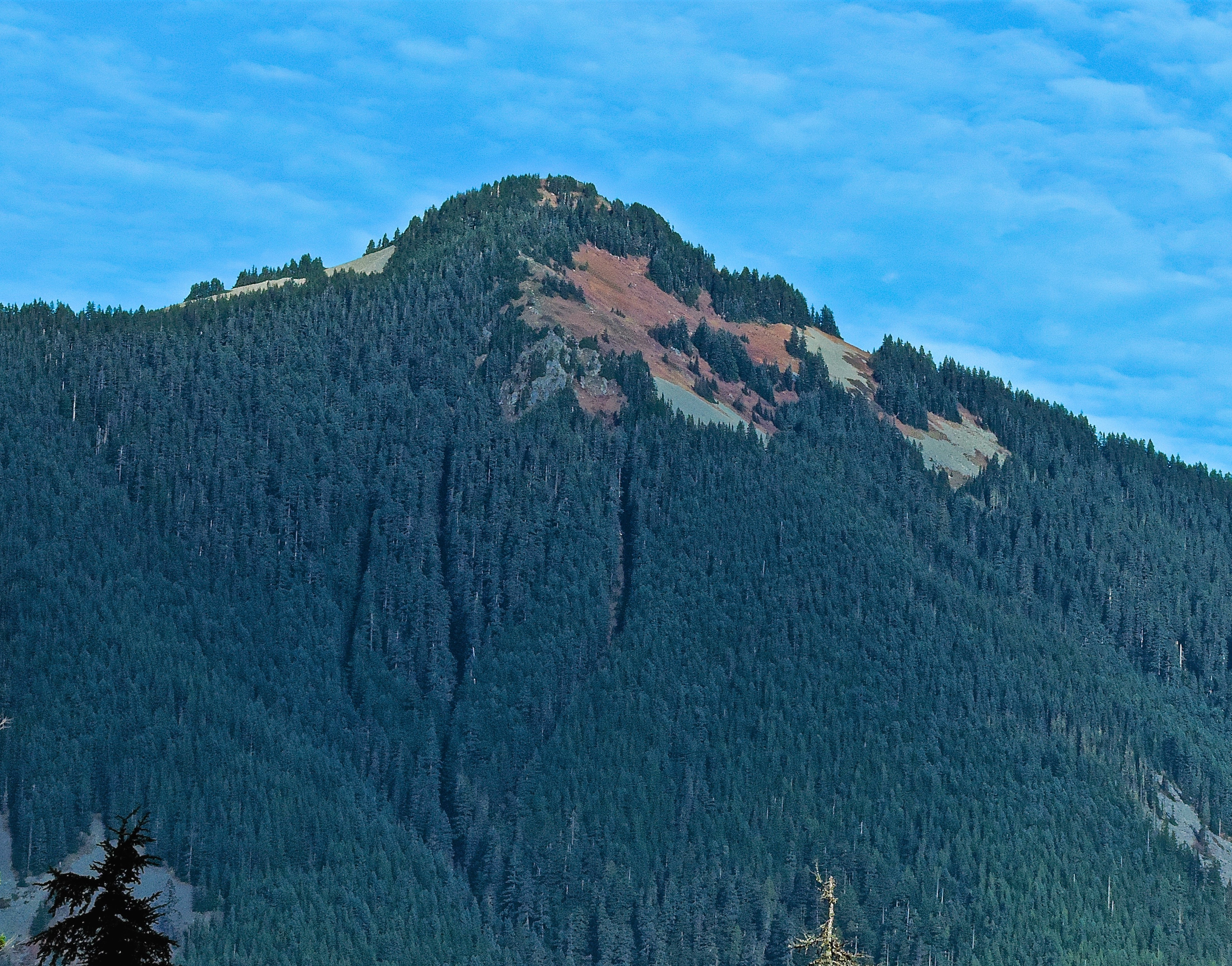
Southwest aspect

During the Pleistocene period dating back over two million years ago, glaciation advancing and retreating repeatedly scoured the landscape leaving deposits of rock debris. The last glacial retreat in the Alpine Lakes area began about 14,000 years ago and was north of the Canada–US border by 10,000 years ago. The U-shaped cross section of the river valleys is a result of that recent glaciation. Uplift and faulting in combination with glaciation have been the dominant processes which have created the tall peaks and deep valleys of the Alpine Lakes Wilderness area.

== See also ==
- List of peaks of the Alpine Lakes Wilderness
