= Bandera Mountain =

Mountain in Washington (state), United States

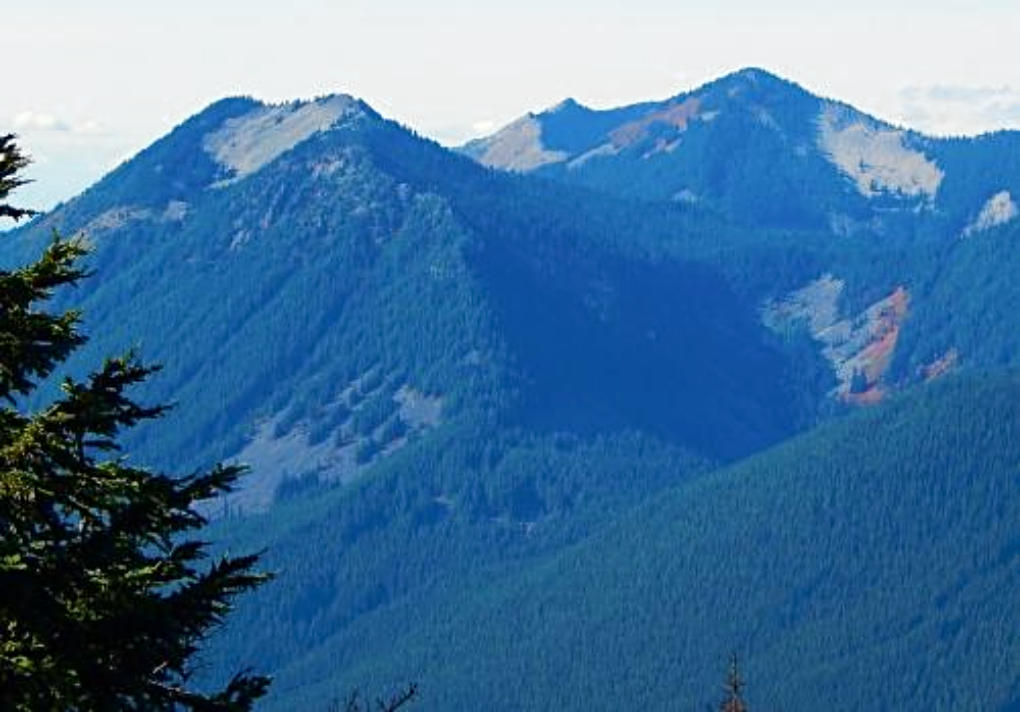
- Bandera Mountain (left) and Mount Defiance (right)

Highest point
- Elevation: 5,245 ft (1,599 m) NAVD 88
- Prominence: 961 ft (293 m)
- Coordinates: 47°24′54″N 121°32′17″W

Geography
- Location within Washington (state) Location within the United States
- Location: Snoqualmie Pass, King County, Washington
- Topo map: USGS Bandera

Climbing
- Easiest route: Trail and Scrambling

Bandera Mountain is a mountain located near Snoqualmie Pass, Washington in the Alpine Lakes Wilderness. The mountain is accessible by the Mason Lake Trail (Ira Spring Memorial Trail), which is located off I-90 at Exit 45 on Forest Road 9031.

== Climate ==
Bandera Mountain is located in the marine west coast climate zone of western North America.

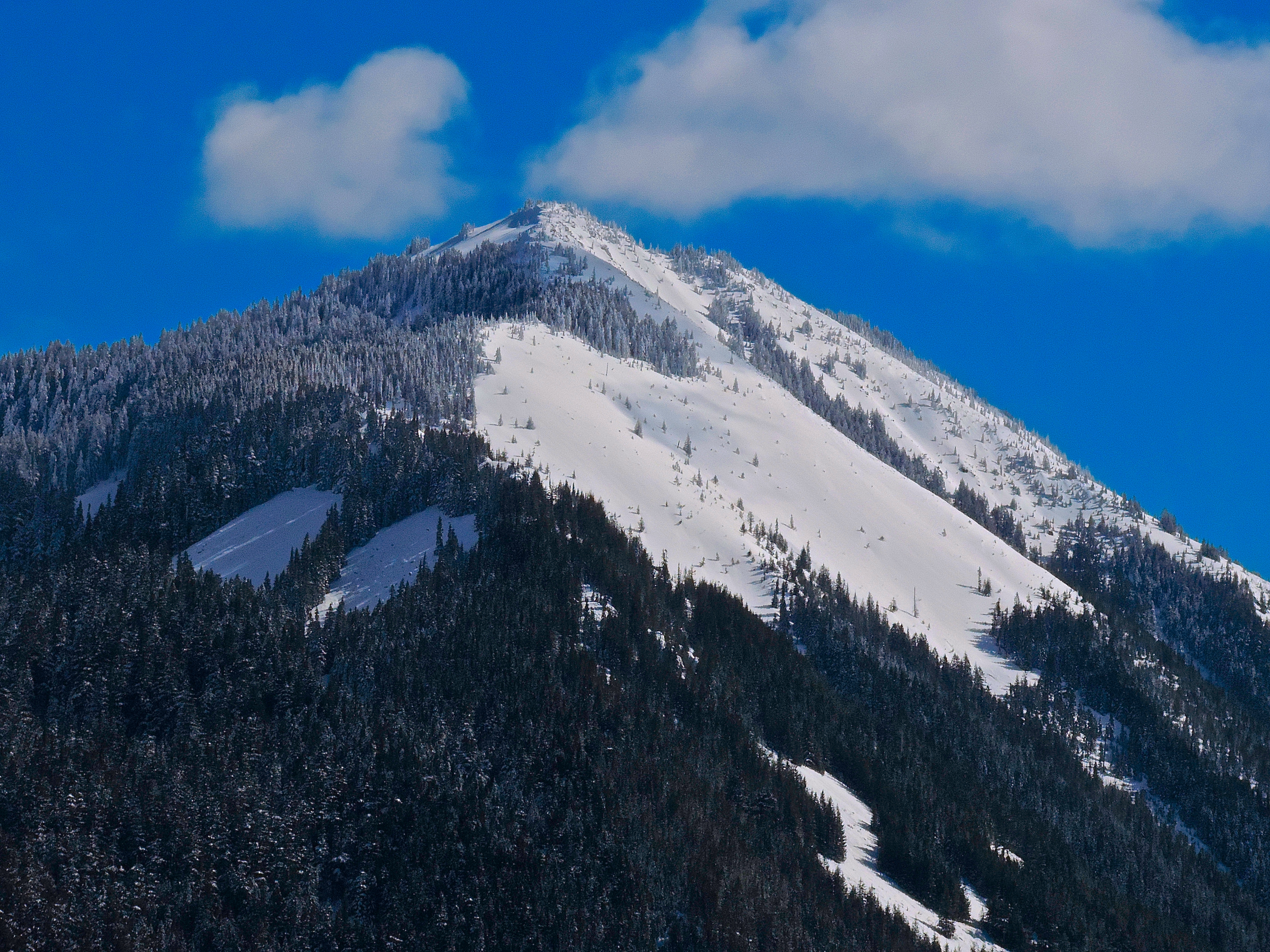
Bandera Mountain in winter

Most weather fronts originate in the Pacific Ocean, and travel northeast toward the Cascade Mountains. As fronts approach, they are forced upward by the peaks of the Cascade Range, causing them to drop their moisture in the form of rain or snowfall onto the Cascades (Orographic lift). As a result, the west side of the Cascades experiences high precipitation, especially during the winter months in the form of snowfall. During winter months, weather is usually cloudy, but, due to high pressure systems over the Pacific Ocean that intensify during summer months, there is often little or no cloud cover during the summer. Precipitation runoff from Bandera Mountain drains into the Snoqualmie River.
