= Chetwoot Lake =

Lake in Washington, United States

- Location within Washington (state) Location within the United States
- Location: King County, Washington, United States
- Coordinates: 47.5565906°N 121.3144193°W
- Primary outflows: West Fork Foss River
- Basin countries: United States
- Surface area: 113 acres (0.46 km^{2})
- Surface elevation: 4,908 ft (1,496 m)

Chetwoot Lake is a freshwater lake located on the western slope of Iron Cap Mountain next to Crawford Lake, in King County, Washington. West Fork Foss River exits Chetwoot Lake towards Angeline Lake and then to a canyon that produces Angeline Falls downstream towards Delta Lake. Because Chetwoot Lake is at the heart of the Alpine Lakes Wilderness, the lake is a popular area for hiking, swimming, and fishing.

Chetwoot is a compound word from the Chinook Jargon chet’-woot or its’woot meaning black bear or grizzly.

== Geography ==
Chetwoot Lake is nestled in a long structural benchland with relatively level or gently inclined land bounded by the distinctly steeper slopes of Tourmaline Peak on the northwest shore of the lake and Atrium Peak above and between Angeline and Big Heart Lake. The lake covers 0.5 kilometres (0.31 miles) from north to south and 1.1 kilometres (0.68 miles) from east to west. The valley follows patterns of geomorphology typical of the Northern Cascade Mountains of the Pacific Mountain System with a bedrock composed of pyrrhotite and pyrite found in thin seams 804 metres (2,638 ft) wide at a depth of 304 metres (997 ft) below the surface. The host rock in this area is greensand from the Lopingian epoch 260 to 250 million years ago.

=== Climate ===
Chetwoot Lake is within a hemiboreal climate. The average temperature is 0 °C. The warmest month is August, with an average temperature of 13 °C, and the coldest month is January, at an average of −10 °C. The average rainfall is 2,989 millimeters per year. The wettest month is January, with 396 millimeters of rain, and the least in July, with 38 millimeters of rain.

Chetwoot Lake

Climate chart (precipitation, max. and min. temperature)
J	F	M	A	M	J	J	A	S	O	N	D
396 −1 −10	354 −1 −10	331 −4 −8	213 9 −4	165 15 −2	104 18 0	38 24 3	48 24 4	114 20 2	298 12 −2	353 4 −7	370 −1 −11
- █ Average max. and min. temperatures in °C
- █ Precipitation totals in mm
Imperial conversion
J	F	M	A	M	J	J	A	S	O	N	D
16 30 14	14 30 14	13 25 18	8.4 48 25	6.5 59 28	4.1 64 32	1.5 75 37	1.9 75 39	4.5 68 36	12 54 28	14 39 19	15 30 12
- █ Average max. and min. temperatures in °F
- █ Precipitation totals in inches

== Access ==
Access to Chetwoot Lake is through West Fork Foss Lakes Trail #1064 off Forest Service road 6835 a side road of Foss River Road (Forest Service Road #68), which exits US Highway 2. The trail borders Trout Lake, Lake Malachite, Copper lake and Little Heart Lake before ending on campsites along Atrium Peak, the ridge between Big Heart Lake and Angeline Lake to the East. Self-issued Alpine Lake Wilderness permit required for transit within the Necklace Valley area.

== See also ==
- List of lakes of the Alpine Lakes Wilderness
- Waterfalls of the West Fork Foss River Valley
