= Iron Cap Lake =

Lake in Washington, United States

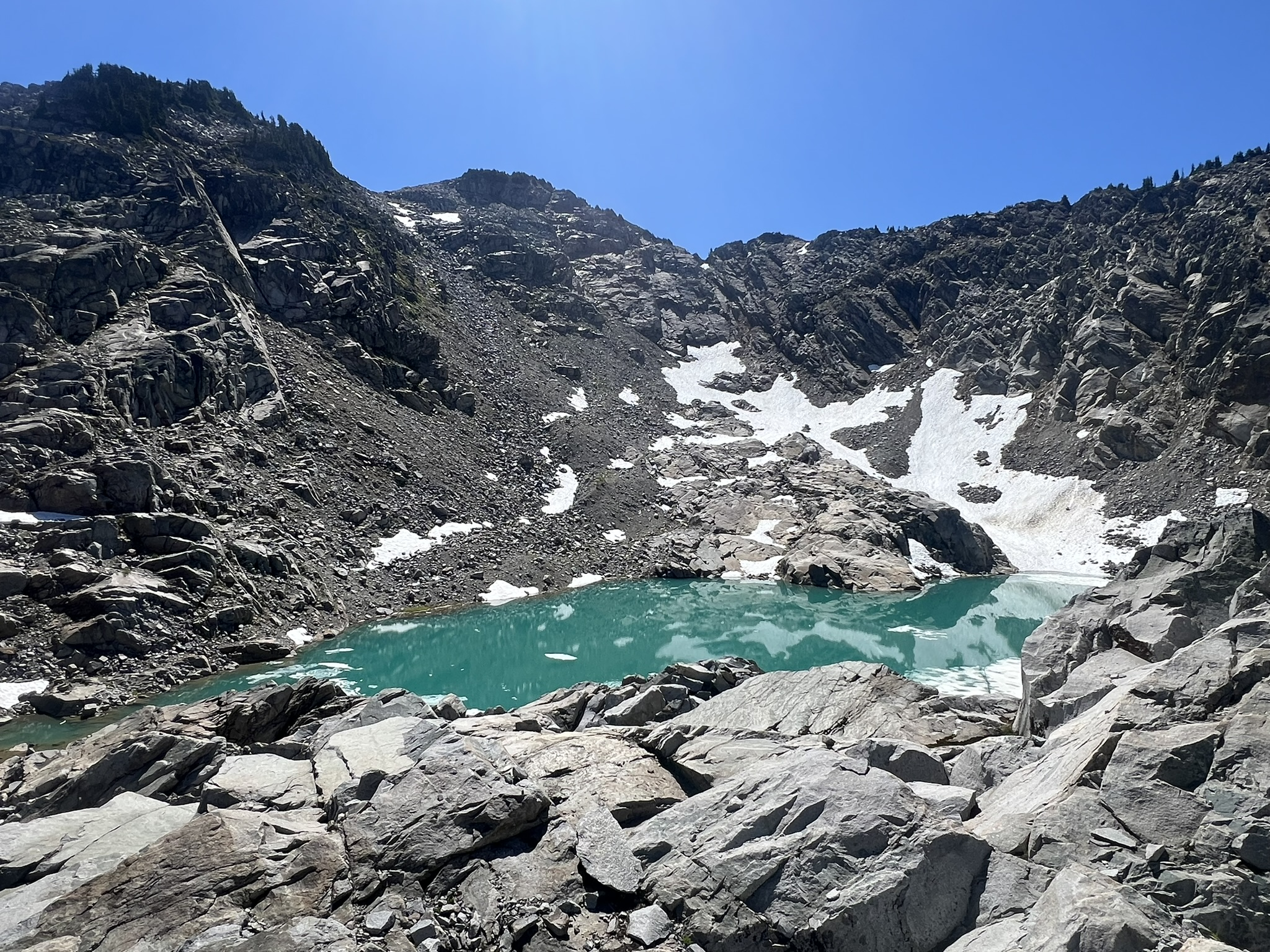
- Iron Cap Lake and Iron Cap Mountain

- Location within Washington (state) Location within the United States
- Location: King County, Washington, United States
- Coordinates: 47.5573°N 121.2906°W
- Basin countries: United States

Iron Cap Lake is a small freshwater lake located in the Alpine Lakes Wilderness, at the south ridge of Azurite Lake and other Necklace Valley lakes in King County, Washington. The lake is nestled on the north skirt of Iron Cap Mountain and produces the West Fork of the Foss River towards Bonnie Lake and contributions from Otter Lake. A short distance towards the West are Crawford Lake and Chetwoot Lake. Self-issued Alpine Lake Wilderness permit required for transit within the Necklace Valley area.

== Geography ==
Iron Cap Lake replicates the geology of the ridges that surround it with Permian volcanic rocks, Jurassic/Crustaceous sedimentary and volcanic rocks, with Tertiary granites and alluvium of recent age. The ridges may have iode gold, lead-zinc and silver known as Iron Cap and Tooker-Leshud deposits.

== West Fork Foss River ==
Iron Cap Lake was formerly a small glacier, snow and ice now feed into the upper West Fork Foss River drainage. Because of the irregular terrain and steep slope through which the West Fork Foss River flows upstream past Otter Lake towards Delta Lake, the river produces rapid rift with frequent rapids and a set of waterfalls including 159 feet (48 m) tall Otter Lake Falls.

== See also ==
- List of lakes of the Alpine Lakes Wilderness
