= Azure Lake (King County, Washington) =

Lake in Washington, United States

- Location within Washington (state) Location within the United States
- Location: King County, Washington, United States
- Coordinates: 47.56281°N 121.3010°W
- Basin countries: United States
- Surface elevation: 4,908 ft (1,496 m)

Azure Lake is a small freshwater lake located in the Alpine Lakes Wilderness, between Azurite Lake and Angeline Lake in King County, Washington. A short distance south towards Iron Cap Mountain is Iron Cap Lake. Towards the North are the steep slopes of Saint Agnes Ridge which continue eastwards towards Otter Lake. Self-issued Alpine Lake Wilderness permit required for transit within the Necklace Valley area. Azure Lake is located in a prominent valley along the southern skirt of the Mount Daniel area in connection with the North-Middle Forks Snoqualmie mountain grouping area.

== See also ==
- List of lakes of the Alpine Lakes Wilderness
