= Foss River Falls =

Waterfall in Washington (state), United States

- Location: King County, Washington
- Type: Tiered
- Total height: 650 feet (200 m)
- Number of drops: 2
- Longest drop: 150 feet (46 m)

Foss River Falls is a 650-foot (200 m) drop on the West Fork Foss River in the Alpine Lakes Wilderness Area, King County, Washington. Its sources are at Delta Lake, and the 70-foot (21 m)-wide drop flows year-round. The waterfall is split into two parts. Each part is split into several tiers.

The upper section starts off by plunging 80 feet (24 m), then cascades 70 feet (21 m), then spits and drops 100 feet (30 m) over a plunge and a horsetail. Then the waters gather and plunge over a 30-foot (9.1 m) drop, and then cascade 150 more feet (46 m) down the gorge. The upper part of the falls, in total, drops about 450 feet (140 m). The upper falls are located at 47°35′50″N 121°18′46″W.

The lower section begins with some small drops that total about 50 feet (15 m), then drops 150 feet (46 m) feet down granite steps and flows into Trout Lake. The falls' flow rate at its base is about 600 cubic feet (17 m^{3}) per second. The lower falls are located at 47°36′13″N 121°18′48″W.

== See also ==
- Waterfalls of the West Fork Foss River Valley
