= Crawford Lake (Washington) =

Lake in Washington, United States

- Location within Washington (state) Location within the United States
- Location: King County, Washington, United States
- Coordinates: 47.55030°N 121.30320°W
- Primary outflows: Crawford Creek
- Basin countries: United States
- Surface elevation: 5,154 ft (1,571 m)

Crawford Lake is a freshwater lake located in the Alpine Lakes Wilderness, at the western ridge of Iron Cap Mountain in King County, Washington. The lake is nestled on a set of prominent valleys and peaks and produces Crawford Creek which flows as one of many tributaries of the Middle Fork Foss River. A short distance towards the north are Chetwoot Lake, Angeline Lake and the Necklace Valley Lakes. Self-issued Alpine Lake Wilderness permit required for transit within the Necklace Valley area.

== Geography ==
Crawford Lake replicates the geology of the ridges of Iron Cap Mountain and others that surround it with Permian volcanic rocks, Jurassic/Crustaceous sedimentary and volcanic rocks, with Tertiary granites and alluvium of recent age. The ridges may have iode gold, lead-zinc and silver known as Iron Cap and Tooker-Leshud deposits.

The Crawford Lake area is notorious for a prominent col the rises at the southwestern shores of the lake.

== See also ==
- List of lakes of the Alpine Lakes Wilderness
