= Angeline Lake =

Lake in Washington, United States

- Location within Washington (state) Location within the United States
- Location: King County, Washington, United States
- Coordinates: 47.5707636°N 121.3071410°W
- Primary outflows: West Fork Foss River
- Basin countries: United States
- Surface area: 183.7 acres (0.743 km^{2})
- Surface elevation: 4,613 ft (1,406 m)

Angeline Lake is a freshwater lake located on the northern slope of Iron Cap Mountain between Otter Lake, Azure Lake and Big Heart Lake, in King County, Washington. Self-issued Alpine Lake Wilderness permit required for transit within the Big Snow Mountain area. West Fork Foss River exits Angeline Lake into a canyon that produces Angeline Falls downstream from Chetwoot Lake to Delta Lake. Because Angeline Lake is at the heart of the Alpine Lakes Wilderness, the lake is a popular area for hiking, swimming, and fishing golden trout, rainbow trout, and cutthroat trout.

== Outlet ==
Angeline Lake has a low watershed to surface area ratio with low flushing rates. The lake has a subterranean outlet. The top land of the outlet channel is blocked by a large landslide. As a consequence, the water exiting the lake percolates in through the landslide and emerges about 1,000 feet downstream from the lake. At this surfacing point, the stream cascades steeply down the hillside over cliffs that line the south side of the Delta Lake basin, forming Angeline Falls, spreading out to 80-100 feet in width and pitching down nearly vertically 424 feet to the talus slopes below. After the pool of the waterfall, the creek cascades for a short distance before again being absorbed into the rocky slope and receding entirely underground again, emerging approximately 600 vertical feet further down at the south end of Delta Lake.

== Geography ==
Angeline Lake is nestled in a long structural benchland with relatively level or gently inclined land bounded by the distinctly steeper slopes of Atrium Peak above and between Angeline and Big Heart Lake. The lake is located in a prominent valley along the western skirt of the Mount Daniel area in connection with the North-Middle Forks Snoqualmie mountain grouping area. The valley follows patterns of geomorphology typical of the Northern Cascade Mountains of the Pacific Mountain System with a bedrock composed of pyrrhotite and pyrite found in thin seams 804 metres (2,638 ft) wide at a depth of 304 metres (997 ft) below the surface. The host rock in this area is greensand from the Lopingian epoch 260 to 250 million years ago.

=== Climate ===
Angeline lake is within a hemiboreal climate. The average temperature is 0°C. The warmest month is August, with an average temperature of 13°C, and the coldest month is January, at an average of −10 °C. The average rainfall is 1,989 millimeters per year. The wettest month is January, with 248 millimeters of rain, and the least in August, with 41 millimeters of rain.

Angeline Lake

Climate chart (precipitation, max. and min. temperature)
J	F	M	A	M	J	J	A	S	O	N	D
248 −2 −9	182 −2 −10	192 0 −8	122 4 −4	115 11 0	98 14 3	45 20 5	41 21 6	87 16 4	160 8 −1	246 1 −5	207 −3 −10
- █ Average max. and min. temperatures in °C
- █ Precipitation totals in mm
Imperial conversion
J	F	M	A	M	J	J	A	S	O	N	D
9.8 28 16	7.2 28 14	7.6 32 18	4.8 39 25	4.5 52 32	3.9 57 37	1.8 68 41	1.6 70 43	3.4 61 39	6.3 46 30	9.7 34 23	8.1 27 14
- █ Average max. and min. temperatures in °F
- █ Precipitation totals in inches

== Access ==
Access to Angeline Lake is through West Fork Foss Lakes Trail #1064 off Forest Service road 6835 a side road of Foss River Road (Forest Service Road #68), which exits U.S. Highway 2. The trail borders Trout Lake, Lake Malachite, Copper Lake and Little Heart Lake before ending on campsites along Atrium Peak, the ridge between Big Heart Lake and Angeline Lake to the East. The output of Big Heart Lake is approximately a mile from the output of Angeline Lake. Self-issued Alpine Lake Wilderness permit required for transit within the Necklace Valley area.

== See also ==
- List of lakes of the Alpine Lakes Wilderness
- Waterfalls of the West Fork Foss River Valley
