= Azurite Lake =

Lake in Washington, United States

- Location within Washington (state) Location within the United States
- Location: King County, Washington, United States
- Coordinates: 47.56879°N 121.29454°W
- Basin countries: United States
- Surface area: 43 acres (0.17 km^{2})
- Surface elevation: 4,524 ft (1,379 m)

Azurite Lake is a freshwater lake located in the Alpine Lakes Wilderness, between Otter Lake and Angeline Lake in King County, Washington. A short distance south towards Iron Cap Mountain is Azure Lake and Iron Cap Lake. The south shore of the lake rests on a prominent granite ledge up towards a hillock and steep heathland that lead to Iron Cap Mountain. The North shore of the lake is bound by the steep slopes of Saint Agnes Ridge which continue on the eastern slopes of Angeline Lake. Self-issued Alpine Lake Wilderness permit required for transit within the Necklace Valley area.

== See also ==
- List of lakes of the Alpine Lakes Wilderness
