= Bald Eagle Lake (Washington) =

Lake in Washington, United States

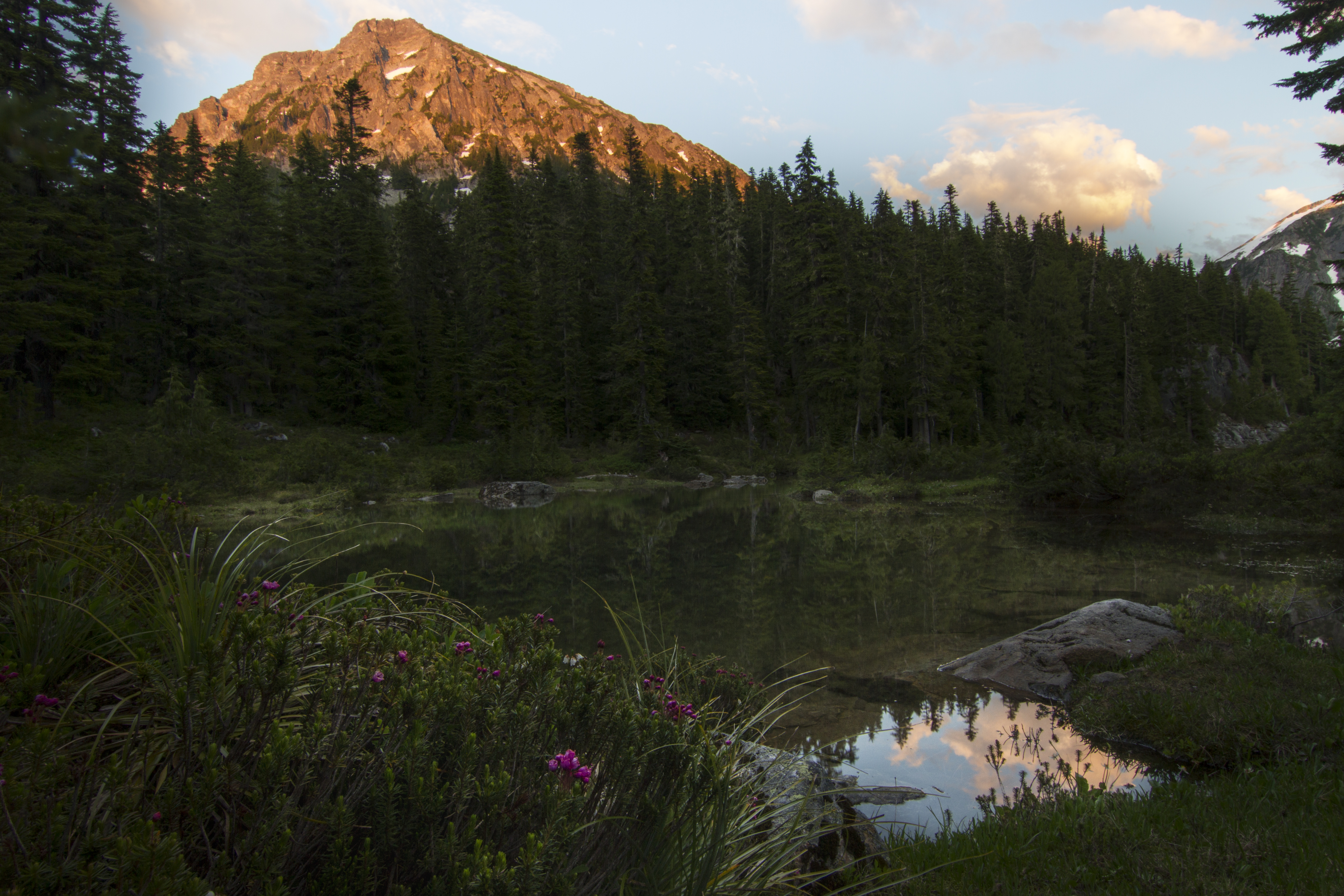
- Bald Eagle Lake and Peak in Necklace Valley

- Location within Washington (state) Location within the United States
- Location: King County, Washington, United States
- Coordinates: 47.6123°N 121.27682°W
- Basin countries: United States
- Surface elevation: 4,547 ft (1,386 m)

Bald Eagle Lake is a freshwater lake located on the north skirt of Screeching Eagle Peak (elevation point 6,031 ft (1,838 m)), a U-shaped ridge massif formed by the junction of Bald Eagle Peak and Silver Eagle Peak, between the West Fork and East Fork of Foss River, in King County, Washington. Other prominent lakes are south of Bald Eagle Lake, including Locket Lake, Otter Lake and Lake Iiswoot, Opal Lake and other Necklace Valley lakes on the eastern slope of Otter Point. Mount Hinman and Mount Daniel are a short distance southeast. Because Bald Eagle Lake is at the heart of the Alpine Lakes Wilderness, the lake is a popular area for hiking, swimming, and fishing.

Access to Bald Eagle Lake is from the Necklace Valley Trailhead on Forest Road 68 which splits off U.S. Route 2.

== See also ==
- List of lakes of the Alpine Lakes Wilderness
