= Bonnie Lake (Washington) =

Freshwater lake

- Location within Washington (state) Location within the United States
- Location: King County, Washington, United States
- Coordinates: 47.56565°N 121.27247°W
- Primary inflows: Perennial
- Primary outflows: Unnamed
- Basin countries: United States
- Surface area: 3.5 ha (8.6 acres)
- Average depth: 6 m (20 ft)
- Max. depth: 13 m (43 ft)
- Water volume: 0.21 hm^{3} (7,400,000 cu ft)
- Surface elevation: 4,875 ft (1,486 m)

Bonnie Lake is a small freshwater lake located in the Alpine Lakes Wilderness, south of Otter Lake and the Necklace Valley lakes in King County, Washington. Two waterfalls are found neighboring the lake, one at the eastern inflow and the other at the western outflow: Upper and Lower Bonnie Lake Falls respectively. A short distance towards the South are Iron Cap Mountain and Iron Cap Lake. Bonnie Lake is surrounded by forests except on the eastern side, which is largely composed of vegetated bedrock, talus, and avalanche tracks. Self-issued Alpine Lake Wilderness permit required for transit within the Necklace Valley area.

== See also ==
- List of lakes of the Alpine Lakes Wilderness
