= Delta Lake (Washington) =

Lake in Washington, United States

- Location within Washington (state) Location within the United States
- Location: King County, Washington, United States
- Coordinates: 47.59173°N 121.310°W
- Primary outflows: West Fork of the Foss River
- Basin countries: United States
- Surface area: 45.6 acres (18.5 ha)
- Average depth: 43 ft (13 m)
- Max. depth: 121 ft (37 m)
- Water volume: 2.37 hm^{3} (84,000,000 cu ft)
- Surface elevation: 3,235 ft (986 m)

Delta Lake is a freshwater lake located in the Alpine Lakes Wilderness, north of the Necklace Valley lakes in King County, Washington. Because Delta lake is at the heart of the Alpine Lakes Wilderness, the lake is a popular area for hiking, swimming, and fishing rainbow trout, and cutthroat trout. Delta Lake is a consequence of the spill of the outlets of three major Alpine Lakes: Otter Lake, Big Heart Lake, and Angeline Lake. The West Fork of the Foss River exits Delta Lake in two outlets which merge into one stream shortly above the top of Upper Foss River Falls.

== Waterfalls ==
Two waterfalls are found neighboring the lake, both at the northern outflow of the lake: 337 ft (103 m) tall Upper Foss River Falls and 251 ft (77 m) tall Lower Foss River Falls. Approximately a mile west downstream of the Delta Lake's inflow from Big Heart Lake is a third waterfall, 1,262 ft (385 m) tall Big Heart Falls, while 424 ft (129 m) tall Angeline Falls is located about the same distance upstream the West Fork Foss River from Angeline Lake towards Delta Lake. Delta Lake is surrounded by forested slopes and, unlike its neighbor lakes, it laks the characteristic talus, and avalanche tracks. Self-issued Alpine Lake Wilderness permits are required for transit around Delta Lake and within the neighboring Necklace Valley area. A prominent delta flows into Delta Lake formed by the West Fork Foss River and other streams from Big Heart Lakes.

== See also ==
- List of lakes of the Alpine Lakes Wilderness
