= Malachite (disambiguation) =

Malachite is a carbonate mineral.

Malachite may also refer to:

- Malachite (color)
- Italian submarine Malachite (1936–1943)
- "Malachite" (song), a 2006 song by Jinn
- Malachite, Colorado, founded by Tom Sharp, now extinct
- Malachite damselflies, in the family Synlestidae
- Malachite Falls and Lake Malachite, in West Fork Foss River Valley, King County, Washington
- Malachite green, an organic molecule used to combat Ichthyophthirius, a protozoan causing white spot disease in aquarium fish
- Siproeta stelenes or malachite, a brush-footed butterfly
- SS Malachite (1902), a British coaster that was sunk in the English Channel in 1914
- A character known as Kunzite in the Japanese version of the manga series Sailor Moon and Malachite in the DIC Entertainment English version
- A character from the Cartoon Network Series Steven Universe
