= Alturas Lake (Alpine Lakes Wilderness) =

Lake in Washington, United States

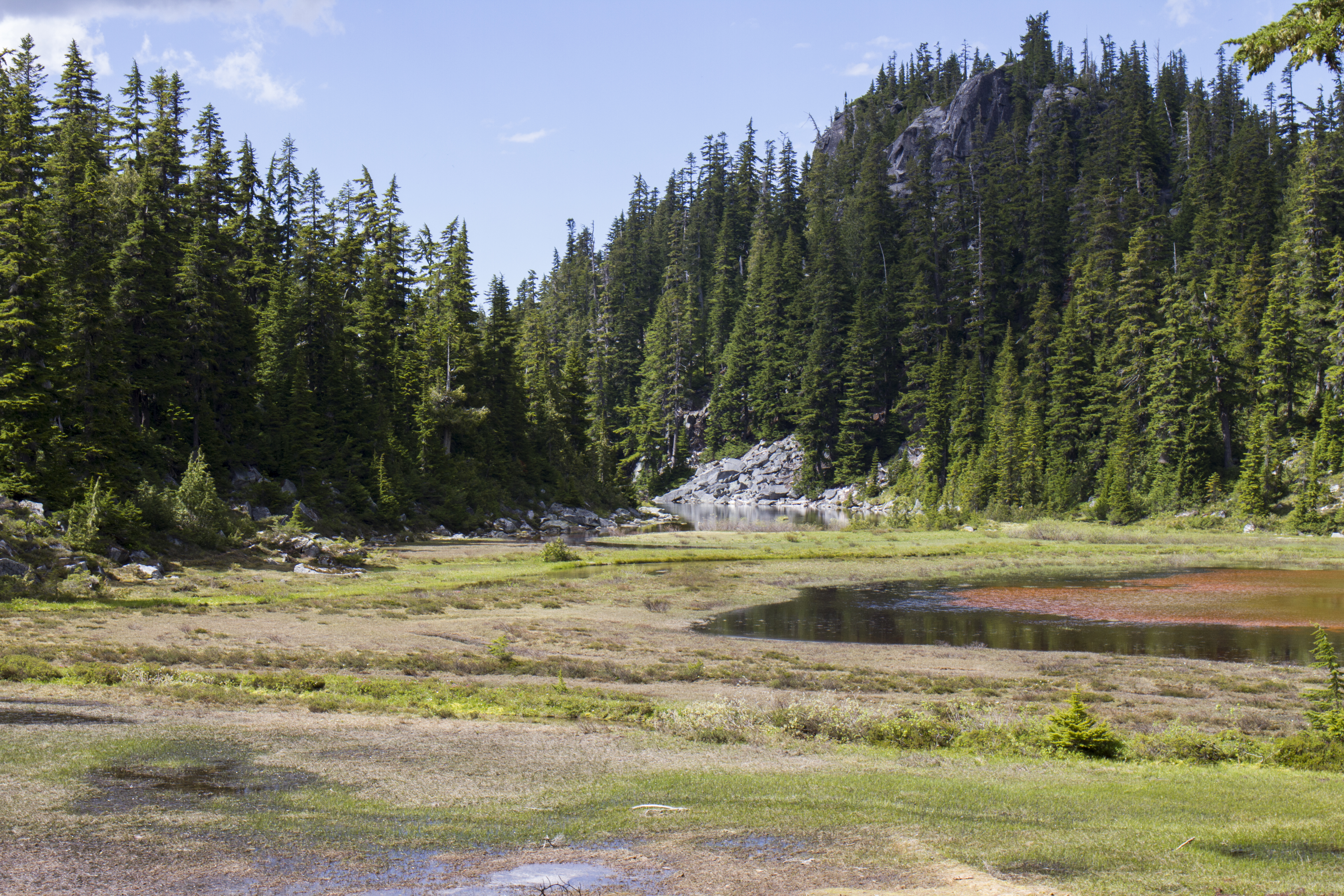
- Section of medows along the shore of Alturas Lake

- Location within Washington (state) Location within the United States
- Location: Chelan County, Washington, United States
- Coordinates: 47.6399290°N 121.2603716°W
- Primary outflows: East Fork Foss River
- Basin countries: United States
- Surface elevation: 1,942 ft (592 m)

Alturas Lake is a freshwater lake located on the northern slope of Bald Eagle Peak, in King County, Washington. Alturas Lake drains North towards Tonga Ridge and into the East Fork of the Foss River.

== Access ==
Access to Alturas Lake is through Necklace Valley Trail #1062 off Foss River Road (Forest Service Road #68), which exits US Highway 2 approximately at mile marker 50.5, just east of the Skykomish Ranger Station. The trail ends in Jade Lake further East from Alturas Lake. Self-issued Alpine Lake Wilderness permit required for transit within the Necklace Valley area.

== See also ==
- List of lakes of the Alpine Lakes Wilderness
