= Foss Glacier =

Glacier in the state of Washington

- Location within Washington (state)
- Type: Mountain glacier
- Location: King County, Washington, U.S.
- Coordinates: 47°34′05″N 121°12′41″W
- Length: .35 mi (0.56 km)
- Terminus: Barren Rock
- Status: Retreating

Foss Glacier is within the Alpine Lakes Wilderness of Snoqualmie National Forest in the U.S. state of Washington and is on the northeast slope of Mount Hinman. Foss Glacier retreated almost 500 m (1,600 ft) between 1950 and 2005. Foss Glacier is separated from the nearly vanished Hinman Glacier to the west by a ridge.

== See also ==
- List of glaciers in the United States
