= Ann Nelson =

American particle physicist (1958–2019)

- Born: Ann Elizabeth Nelson; April 29, 1958; Baton Rouge, Louisiana, U.S.
- Died: August 4, 2019 (aged 61); Alpine Lakes Wilderness, Washington, U.S.
- Education: Harvard University; Stanford University
- Awards: Guggenheim Fellowship (2004); Sakurai Prize (2018)
- Scientific career
- Fields: Particle physics
- Doctoral advisor: Howard Georgi

Ann Elizabeth Nelson (April 29, 1958 – August 4, 2019) was an American particle physicist and professor of physics in the Particle Theory Group at the University of Washington from 1994 until her death. Nelson received a Guggenheim Fellowship in 2004, and she was elected to the American Academy of Arts and Sciences in 2011 and the National Academy of Sciences in 2012. She was a recipient of the 2018 J. J. Sakurai Prize for Theoretical Particle Physics, presented annually by the American Physical Society and considered one of the most prestigious prizes in physics.

== Education ==
Born in Baton Rouge, Louisiana, Nelson earned her Bachelor of Science degree at Stanford University in 1980, and her Ph.D. degree at Harvard University under the supervision of Howard Georgi in 1984.

== Career ==
After a post doctoral fellowship at the Harvard Society of Fellows from 1984 to 1987, Nelson became an assistant professor at Stanford University in 1987. In 1990 Nelson moved to UC San Diego, and then in 1994 moved for the final time her career to the University of Washington.

== Research ==
Nelson is known for a number of theories, including:

- The Nelson–Barr mechanism, a proposed solution to the strong CP problem. The theory was developed independently by Nelson and Stephen Barr in 1984. Nelson was a doctoral student at Harvard at the time.
- The theory of spontaneous violation of CP (charge conjugation and parity symmetry), which may explain the origin of the asymmetry observed between matter and anti-matter.
- The theory of Bose–Einstein condensation of kaon mesons in dense matter, which predicts strangeness in neutron stars.
- The basic mechanism for electroweak baryogenesis, which may explain the origin of matter in the universe.
- The theory of gauge-mediated supersymmetry breaking, which accounts for how supersymmetry at short distances might be compatible with the absence of observed flavor-symmetry violation at long distances.
- The little Higgs theory, which may explain why the Higgs boson must be relatively light.
- The theory of "accelerons", which relates neutrino masses to the cosmological dark energy responsible for the relatively recent acceleration of the expansion of the universe.

== Personal life ==
Nelson was married to David B. Kaplan, also a professor of physics at the University of Washington. She had been an active member of The Mountaineers club in Seattle since 1994. She had two children.

Nelson was an activist for equal rights throughout her life. In 1980, when graduating from Stanford University, she and her husband wore colored ribbons to protest Stanford's investments in Apartheid South Africa. In 2017, she led physics lectures in Palestine to support social justice and promote diversity in science fields around the world. She advocated for greater representation of women in physics research.

=== Death ===
On August 4, 2019, while hiking Iron Cap Mountain in the Alpine Lakes Wilderness with her husband and two friends, Nelson lost her footing and died after falling into a rocky gully. Her husband and fellow hikers were rescued on August 4 by a Spokane helicopter crew. Her body was recovered on August 6.
