= Bald Eagle Peak =

Mountain in Washington (state), United States

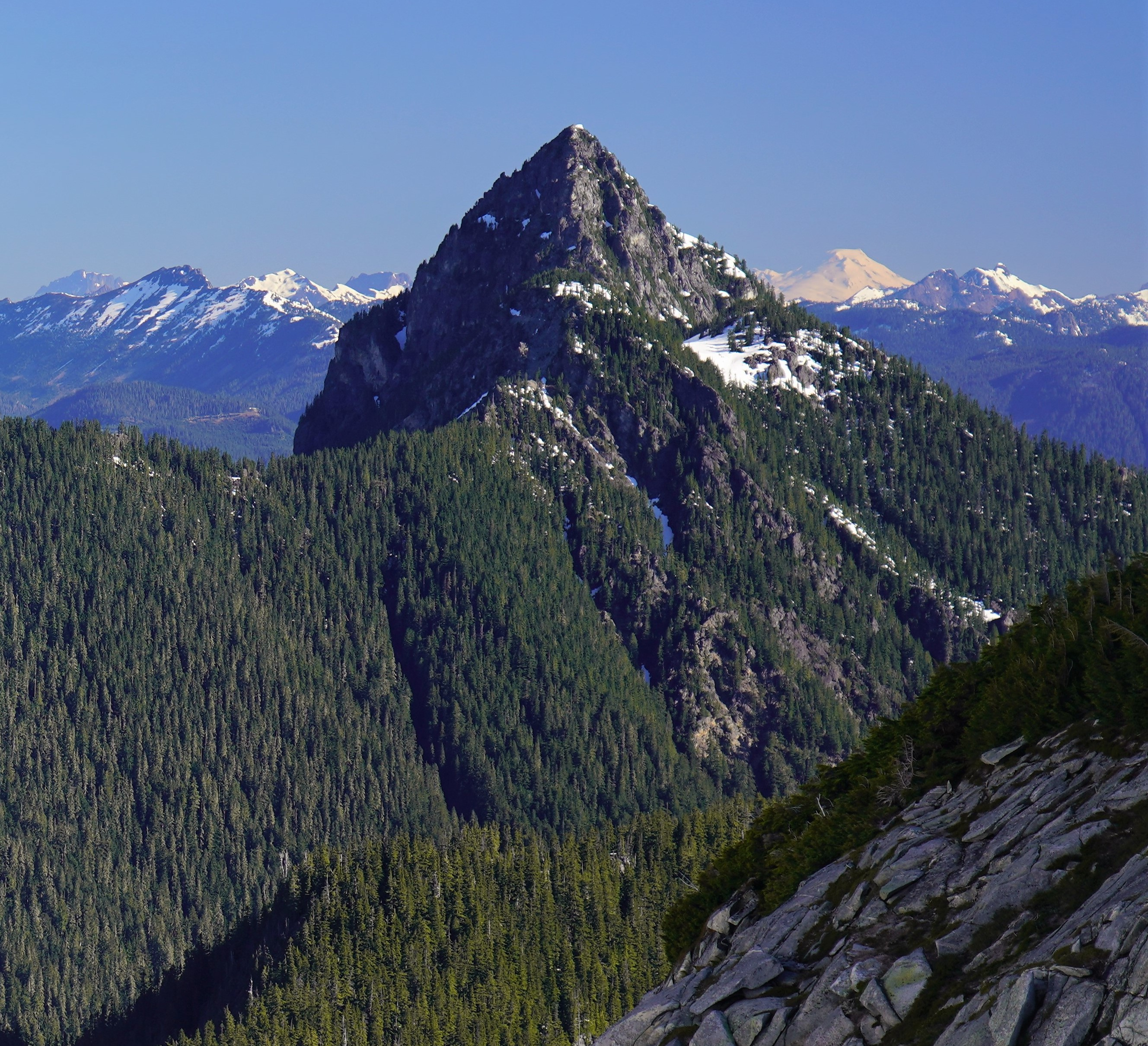
- South aspect

Highest point
- Elevation: 6,259 ft (1,908 m)
- Prominence: 1,019 ft (311 m)
- Parent peak: Otter Point (6,359 ft)
- Isolation: 2.75 mi (4.43 km)
- Coordinates: 47°37′01″N 121°16′18″W

Geography
- Location within Washington (state) Location within the United States
- Country: United States
- State: Washington
- County: King County
- Protected area: Alpine Lakes Wilderness
- Parent range: Cascade Range
- Topo map: USGS Big Snow Mountain

Climbing
- First ascent: 1933 Hermann Ulrichs, Ben Falkenburg
- Easiest route: class 3 scrambling North Ridge

Bald Eagle Peak is a 6,259-foot (1,908-metre) mountain summit located 7.4 mi (11.9 km) southeast of Skykomish, in eastern King County of Washington state. It's part of the Cascade Range, and is situated in the Alpine Lakes Wilderness, on land managed by Mount Baker-Snoqualmie National Forest. Precipitation runoff from this mountain drains into tributaries of the Foss River. This peak is set on the divide between the east and west forks of Foss River. The nearest neighbor is Silver Eagle Peak, 1.1 mi (1.8 km) to the southwest, and Bald Eagle Lake lies in a cirque midway between the pair. The first ascent of this peak was made in 1933 by Hermann Ulrichs and Ben Falkenburg via the North Ridge. This mountain's toponym and correct location was officially adopted September 8, 1988, by the U.S. Board on Geographic Names. Some older maps will have this peak erroneously labeled at Silver Eagle Peak's location.

== Climate ==
Bald Eagle Peak is located in the marine west coast climate zone of western North America. Most weather fronts originate in the Pacific Ocean, and travel northeast toward the Cascade Mountains. As fronts approach, they are forced upward by the peaks of the Cascade Range, causing them to drop their moisture in the form of rain or snowfall onto the Cascades (Orographic lift). As a result, the west side of the Cascades experiences high precipitation, especially during the winter months in the form of snowfall. Because of maritime influence, snow tends to be wet and heavy, resulting in high avalanche danger. During winter months, weather is usually cloudy, but, due to high pressure systems over the Pacific Ocean that intensify during summer months, there is often little or no cloud cover during the summer. The months July through September offer the most favorable weather for viewing or climbing this peak.

== Geology ==
The Alpine Lakes Wilderness features some of the most rugged topography in the Cascade Range with craggy peaks and ridges, deep glacial valleys, and granite walls spotted with over 700 mountain lakes. Geological events occurring many years ago created the diverse topography and drastic elevation changes over the Cascade Range leading to the various climate differences.

The history of the formation of the Cascade Mountains dates back millions of years ago to the late Eocene Epoch. With the North American Plate overriding the Pacific Plate, episodes of volcanic igneous activity persisted. In addition, small fragments of the oceanic and continental lithosphere called terranes created the North Cascades about 50 million years ago.

During the Pleistocene period dating back over two million years ago, glaciation advancing and retreating repeatedly scoured and shaped the landscape. The last glacial retreat in the Alpine Lakes area began about 14,000 years ago and was north of the Canada–US border by 10,000 years ago. The U-shaped cross section of the river valleys is a result of that recent glaciation. Uplift and faulting in combination with glaciation have been the dominant processes which have created the tall peaks and deep valleys of the Alpine Lakes Wilderness area.

== See also ==
- List of peaks of the Alpine Lakes Wilderness

== Gallery ==
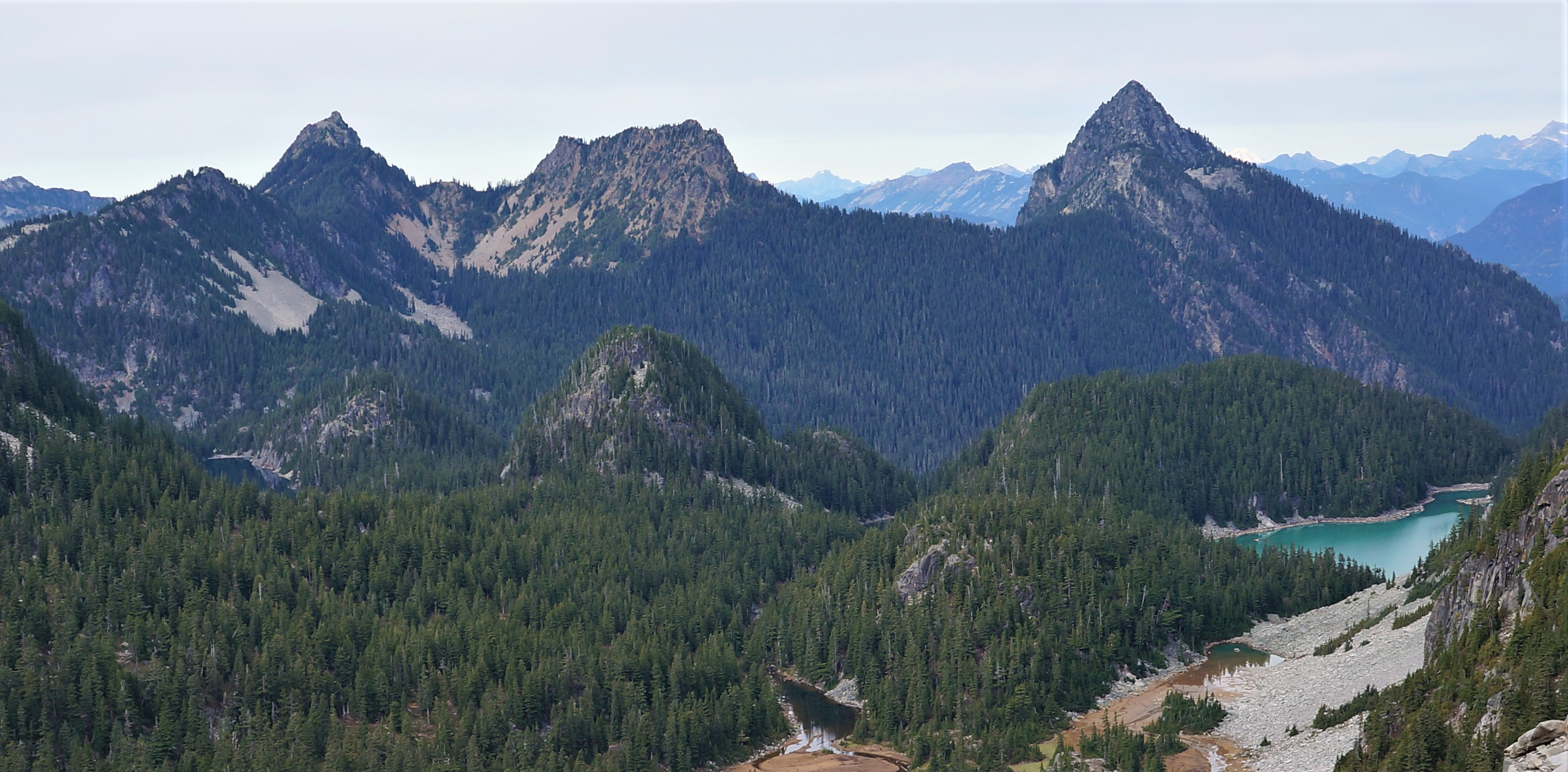
Silver Eagle to left, and Bald Eagle to right

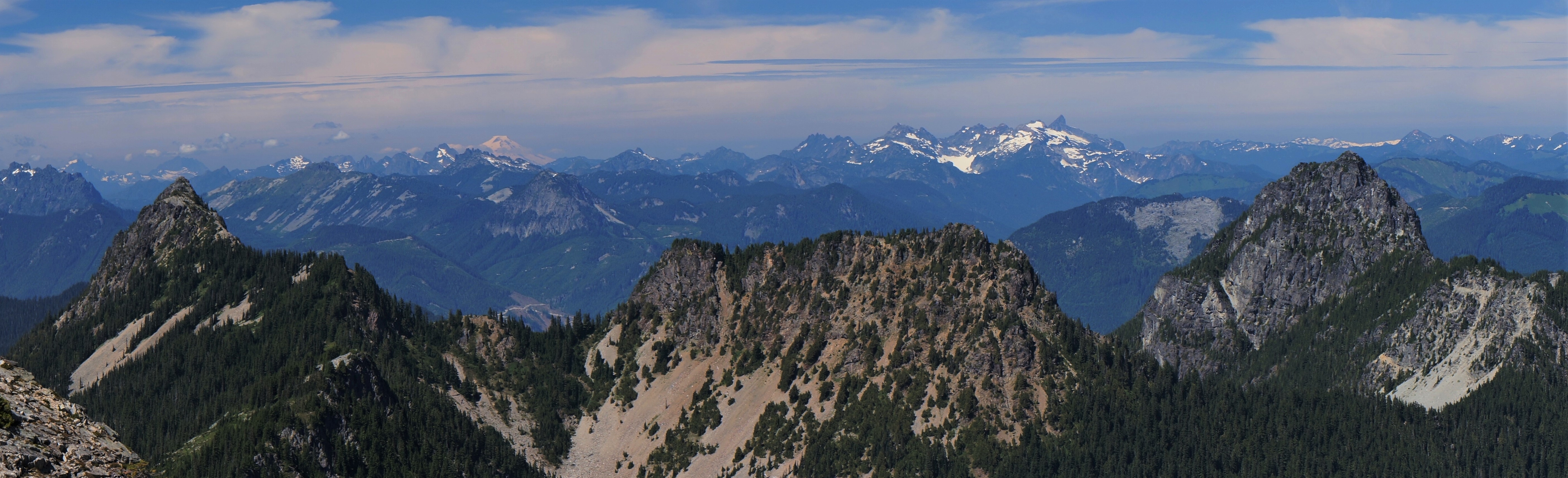
View from Otter Point with Silver Eagle to far left, and Bald Eagle to far right

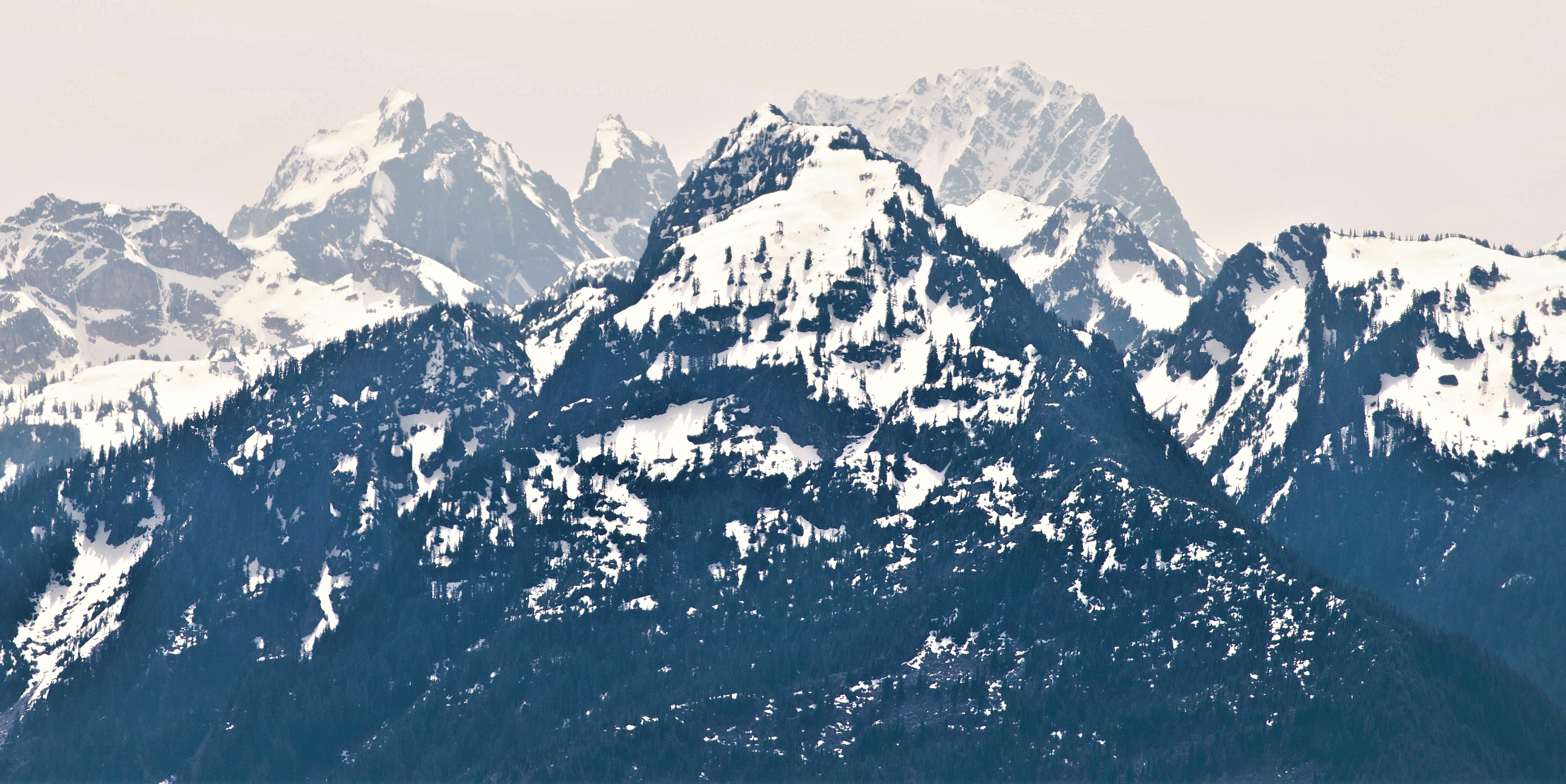
North aspect of Bald Eagle Peak viewed from Beckler Peak.
