= Big Heart Falls =

Waterfall in Washington (state), United States

Coordinates: 47°35′03″N 121°19′07″W

- Interactive map of Big Heart Falls
- Location: Alpine Lakes Wilderness Area, King County, Washington, U.S.
- Type: Tiered
- Total height: 1,268 feet (386 m)
- Number of drops: 2
- Total width: 300 feet (91 m)
- Watercourse: unnamed

Big Heart Falls is a waterfall on the outlet stream of Big Heart Lake, which eventually flows into the Skykomish River, in King County, Washington. It is located between the outlet of Big Heart Lake and the inlet of Delta Lake. The falls are said to drop approximately 1,268 feet (386 m).

The falls have two stages separated by a series of cascades. Each of the main tiers is approximately 600 feet (180 m) tall. It has an average volume of 80 cubic feet per second (2.3 m^{3}/s). The waterfall is also very difficult to access. For one to reach it, one must circumnavigate Delta Lake and cross Copper Creek, a large glacial stream.

The waterfall is located less than a quarter mile from Angeline Falls, and shares the same cliff with it. Big Heart Lake was presumably named because of its roughly heart shaped surface.
