= Mount Hinman =

Mountain in Washington (state), United States

Highest point
- Elevation: 7,492 ft (2,284 m)
- Prominence: 1,252 ft (382 m)
- Coordinates: 47°34′05″N 121°12′41″W

Geography
- Location within Washington (state) Location within the United States
- Location: King County and Kittitas County, Washington, U.S.
- Parent range: Cascade Range
- Topo map: USGS Mount Daniel

Geology
- Rock age: Oligocene

Climbing
- First ascent: 1928

Mount Hinman (7,492 feet (2,284 m)) is located on the border of Snoqualmie and Wenatchee National Forests in the U.S. state of Washington. Mount Hinman is less than 2 mi (3.2 km) west of Mount Daniel and both are within the Alpine Lakes Wilderness. Hinman Glacier is situated on the north flank of Mount Hinman and Foss Glacier is to the northeast. The mountain was named in 1934 for Dr. Harry B. Hinman, a founder of the Everett branch of The Mountaineers club.

== Climate ==
Most weather fronts originate in the Pacific Ocean, and travel east toward the Cascade Mountains. As fronts approach, they are forced upward by the peaks of the Cascade Range, causing them to drop their moisture in the form of rain or snowfall onto the Cascades (Orographic lift). As a result, the Cascades experience high precipitation, especially during the winter months in the form of snowfall. During winter months, weather is usually cloudy, but, due to high pressure systems over the Pacific Ocean that intensify during summer months, there is often little or no cloud cover during the summer.

== Geology ==
The Alpine Lakes Wilderness features some of the most rugged topography in the Cascade Range with craggy peaks and ridges, deep glacial valleys, and granite walls spotted with over 700 mountain lakes. Geological events occurring many years ago created the diverse topography and drastic elevation changes over the Cascade Range leading to the various climate differences.

The history of the formation of the Cascade Mountains dates back millions of years ago to the late Eocene Epoch. With the North American Plate overriding the Pacific Plate, episodes of volcanic igneous activity persisted. In addition, small fragments of the oceanic and continental lithosphere called terranes created the North Cascades about 50 million years ago.

During the Pleistocene period dating back over two million years ago, glaciation advancing and retreating repeatedly scoured the landscape leaving deposits of rock debris. The last glacial retreat in the Alpine Lakes area began about 14,000 years ago and was north of the Canada–US border by 10,000 years ago. The U-shaped cross section of the river valleys is a result of that recent glaciation. Uplift and faulting in combination with glaciation have been the dominant processes which have created the tall peaks and deep valleys of the Alpine Lakes Wilderness area.

== Gallery ==
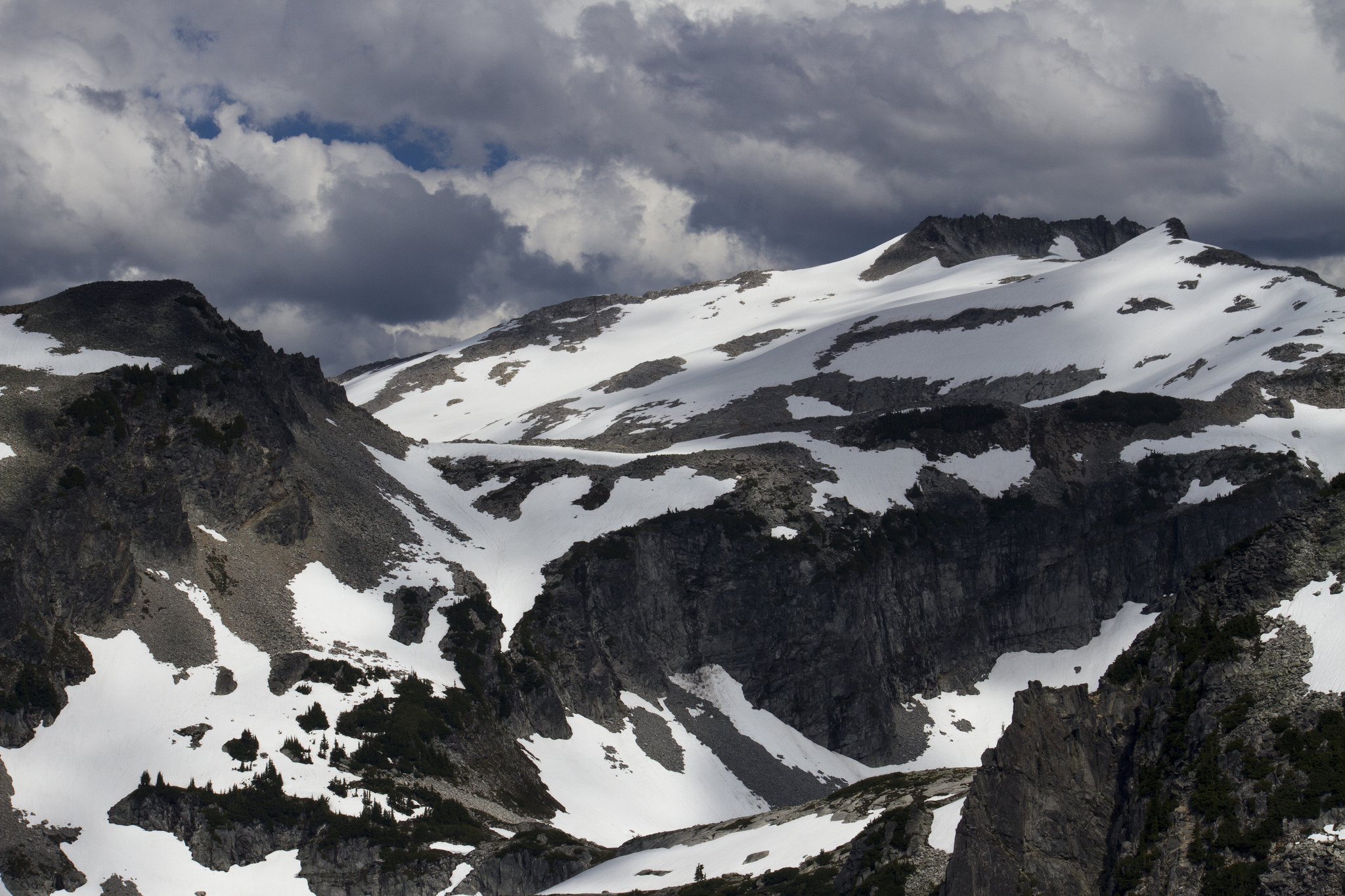
Mount Hinman

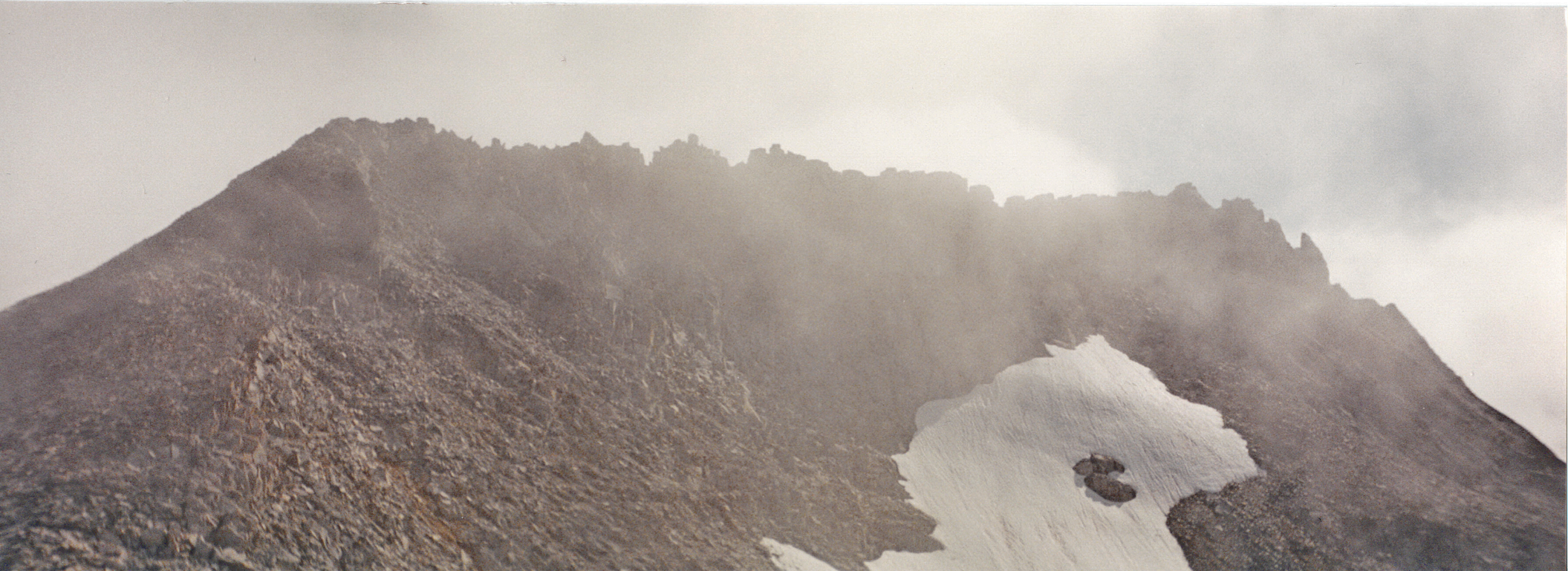
Summit detail

== See also ==
- List of peaks of the Alpine Lakes Wilderness
- Geology of the Pacific Northwest
- Geography of Washington (state)
