= Hinman Glacier =

Former glacier in Washington, United States

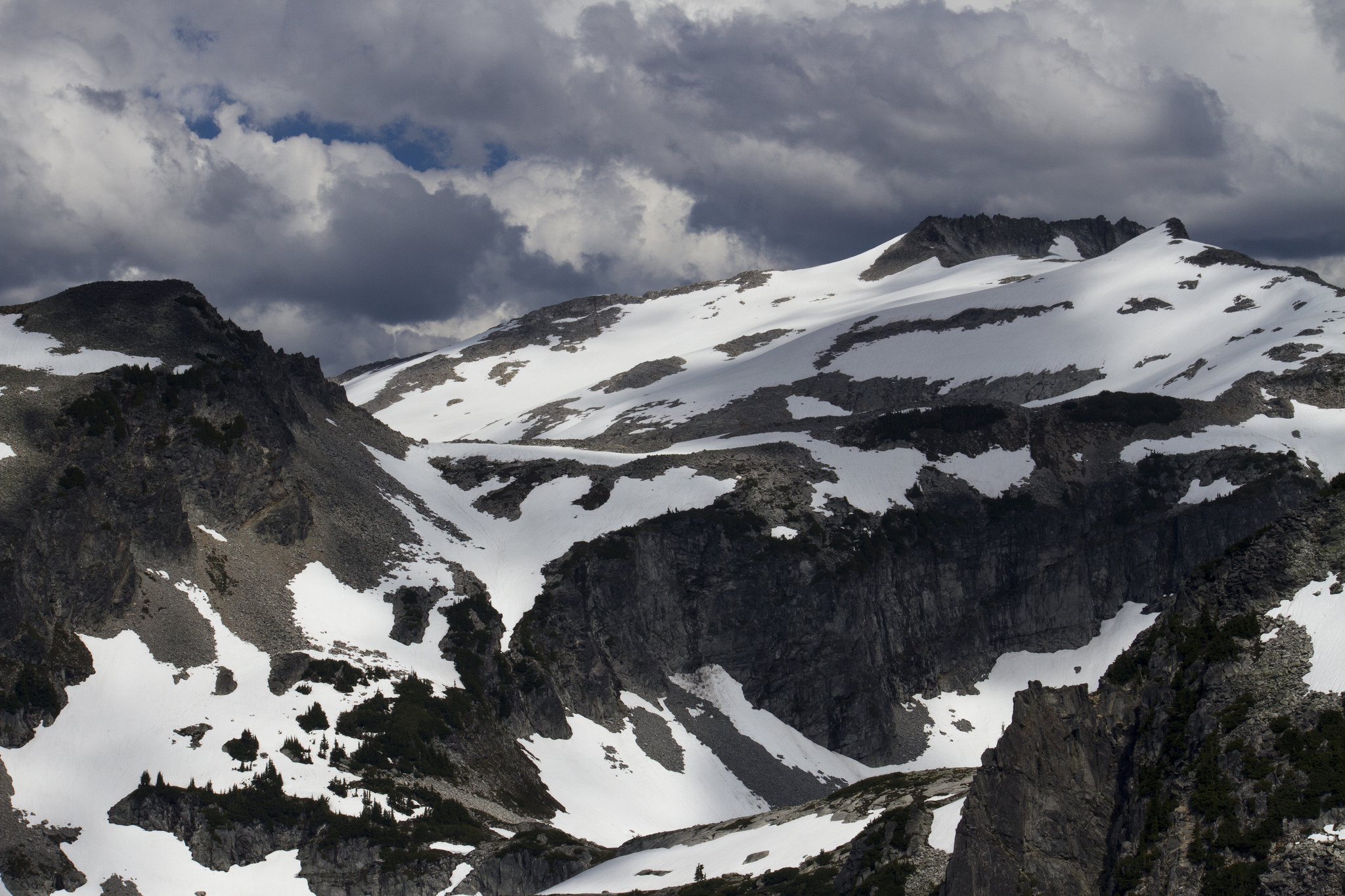
- Hinman Glacier seen above Necklace Valley in 2016.
- Interactive map of Hinman Glacier in the Central Washington Cascades.
- Interactive map of Hinman Glacier
- Type: Alpine glacier
- Location: Snoqualmie National Forest, King County, Washington, U.S.
- Coordinates: 47°34′29″N 121°13′44″W
- Status: Extinct

Hinman Glacier was a glacier that flowed to the north and northwest from near the summit of Mount Hinman, in the U.S. state of Washington. Hinman Glacier was within the Alpine Lakes Wilderness of Snoqualmie National Forest. The glacier was approximately 1.3 km^{2} (320 acres) in 1971, making it the largest glacier between Mount Rainier and Glacier Peak, but an expedition by glaciologists from Nichols College in August 2022 discovered that the glacier had disappeared, with only a few snowfields and non-flowing remnant ice areas totalling 0.04 km^{2} (9.9 acres) remaining. Smaller glaciers in this part of the Cascade Range preceded the Hinman Glacier in disappearing as part of the retreat of glaciers since 1850 with only three glaciers remaining in King County.

== History ==
Evidence suggests that Hinman Glacier may have formed as early as the retreat of the Cordilleran ice sheet, which covered the region approximately 14,000 years ago, with it being at least as old as the Mount Mazama eruption 7,000 years ago that created Crater Lake in Oregon.

=== Loss of glacier ===
Made up of two sections, the western lobe was the first to disappear, leaving only small patches of ice by 2009. The glacier persisted on the north flank of Mount Hinman for another decade and repeat photography showed rapid retreat. A new lake, unofficially named Hinman Lake, formed behind the terminal moraine during the second half of the 20th Century as the ice receded. Fragments of the glacier in the form of ice masses are dispersed within and around the lake. In 2023, the glacier was reported to be extinct.

== Environmental impact ==
Meltwater from Hinman Glacier fed the Skykomish River and in concert with the decline of other glacial ice in this portion of the Cascades, this has led to negative impacts on streamflow of the river and drainage basin into the Puget Sound near Everett. With less dependable late-summer waterflow, measured at approximately 55% surface loss, the depletion can cause harm to Pacific Northwest salmon and other aquatic life in the river, as well as the local population who depend on the waters.

== See also ==
- List of glaciers in the United States
