= Angeline Falls =

Waterfall in Washington (state), United States

Coordinates: 47°35′00″N 121°18′37″W

Angeline Falls is a large waterfall located on an unnamed tributary of the West Fork Foss River in Alpine Lakes Wilderness Area, King County, Washington. It is a horsetail type waterfall 450 feet (137 m) high and more than 120 feet (37 m) wide. The waterfall is perennial and flows from the outlet of Angeline Lake to the head of Delta Lake. It is at 47.58340^{o}N, 121.31034^{o}W.

Angeline Falls is located where the subterranean outlet of Angeline Lake rises out of the sheer cliff. According to the Northwest Waterfall Survey, it is "among the best in Washington State" and ranks number 9 in a list of best waterfalls in the Pacific Northwest. Access to the spectacular falls is considered difficult, only recommended for experienced hikers, and includes potentially waist-deep wading through a water outlet across a logjam, to the east shore of Delta Lake for the best view.

== See also ==
- List of waterfalls

== Sources ==
- Northwest Waterfalls Survey, Angeline Falls, description
- Northwest Waterfalls Survey, Angeline Falls, photo
- Northwest Waterfalls Survey, Best of the Northwest (100 best waterfalls)
