= Big Heart Lake =

- Location within Washington (state) Location within the United States
- Location: Alpine Lakes Wilderness, King County, Washington, United States
- Coordinates: 47.577°N 121.318°W
- Type: Alpine Lake
- Primary inflows: Glacial Runoff
- Primary outflows: West Fork Foss River Tributary
- Surface area: 175.9 acres (71.2 ha)
- Surface elevation: 4,418 ft (1,347 m)

Big Heart Lake is the most remote and highest-elevation on-trail lake in the West Fork Foss River system. It is a 14.6-mile (23.5 km) round-trip hike from the trailhead, just off of the Foss River Road. The lake is located at the eastern base of Camp Robber Peak in the Alpine Lakes Wilderness Area, within King County, Washington.

Reaching Big Heart Lake requires a significant elevation gain of over 3,000 feet from the trailhead, and the lake itself has a surface elevation of 4,418 feet.

== Ecology ==
Big Heart Lake demonstrates many of the typical attributes of higher elevation lakes. These lakes often have high productivity rates during the summer but over the entire year are relatively unproductive. This results in widely varying fish populations across the alpine lakes in Washington. However, a common trait of alpine trout is possessing a head disproportionately large in comparison to the body. When this trait is observed it is a direct reflection of low productivity in the lake, as the fish is not able to find enough food to support body growth or size equivalent to that of its head. Big Heart itself has been stocked with fish at least three times in its history. Each time, once in 2001, 2005, and 2009, about 15,000 fish consisting of a mix of rainbow and cutthroat trout were deposited in the lake. During the summer, this lake experiences a may fly hatch most days.

== Popularity ==
Big Heart Lake along with the other Foss Lakes has long been one of the most popular hikes or backpacking trips in the Cascades. The area is well known for its multitude of gorgeous lakes and options accessible while on a trip to Big Heart Lake. A NorthWest Forest pass is required to park at the trail head and a self issued Alpine Lakes Wilderness permit is also required.

== See also ==
- List of lakes of the Alpine Lakes Wilderness
- Waterfalls of the West Fork Foss River Valley
