= Otter Lake (Washington) =

Freshwater lake in King County, Washington

- Location within Washington (state) Location within the United States
- Location: King County, Washington, United States
- Coordinates: 47.577739°N 121.287578°W
- Basin countries: United States
- Surface area: 175 acres (0.71 km^{2})
- Surface elevation: 3,930 ft (1,200 m)

Otter Lake is a freshwater lake located on the western slope of Otter Point northwest of Maple Valley in King County, Washington. Self-issued Alpine Lake Wilderness permit required for transit within the Big Snow Mountain area. Other prominent lakes are west of Otter Lake, including Angeline Lake, Azurite Lake and Big Heart Lake, while Opal Lake and other Necklace Valley lakes are on the eastern slope of Otter Point. Because Otter Lake is at the heart of the Alpine Lakes Wilderness, the lake is a popular area for hiking, swimming, and fishing.

== See also ==
- List of lakes of the Alpine Lakes Wilderness
- Waterfalls of the West Fork Foss River Valley
