= Waterfalls of the West Fork Foss River Valley =

Waterfall in Washington, United States

The valley of the West Fork Foss River contains a fair amount of waterfalls. The river heads in a series of large lakes: Big Heart Lake, Angeline Lake, and Otter Lake- which form spectacular waterfalls as they plunge down to Delta Lake. On the valley walls downstream of Delta Lake, are found even more waterfalls.

There are a series of waterfalls occurring on the cliff where Malachite Lake and Copper Lake's outlet streams plunge down to meet the West Fork Foss River, in King County, Washington. This cliff drops thousands of feet into the basin of the West Fork, forming two sets of five waterfalls total. Two other waterfalls also drop down the cliff further downstream along the drainage. There are also some waterfalls on the West Fork itself.

== Copper/Malachite Lakes Headwall ==
Waterfalls on the cliff separating the lakes and the West Fork below include Malachite Falls, Copper Lake Falls, and the Upper, Middle, and Lower Copper Falls. All these waterfalls are on a watercourse informally named Copper Creek. Falls are arranged proceeding downstream.

=== Copper Lake Falls ===
Copper Lake Falls
- Interactive map of Copper Lake Falls
- Coordinates: 47.60973°N 121.33078°W
- Type: Tiered
- Elevation: 3,823 feet (1,165 m)
- Total height: 120 to 140 feet (37 to 43 m)
- Number of drops: 3
- Longest drop: 60 feet (18 m)
- Total width: 20 feet (6.1 m)
- Watercourse: Copper Creek
- Average flow rate: 75 cubic feet (2.1 m^{3}) per second

Copper Lake Falls is a waterfall about 0.25 miles (0.40 km) upstream from Malachite Falls. Its three tiers total about 120 feet (37 m) in height, and its tallest drop is 60 feet (18 m). The two lower drops probably disappear into the talus they cascade over during lower stream flows, but the upper tier flows over rock hard enough to sustain it all year. The falls flows best from April to July.

The falls is found about 1.75 miles (2.82 km) further on the trail from the viewpoint of Malachite Falls. In total, from the trailhead, the distance to the falls is about 3.75 miles (6.04 km).

=== Malachite Falls ===
Malachite Falls
- Interactive map of Malachite Falls
- Coordinates: 47.61162°N 121.33007°W
- Type: Horsetail
- Elevation: 3,559 feet (1,085 m)
- Total height: 600 feet (180 m)
- Number of drops: 1
- Total width: 75 feet (23 m)
- Watercourse: Copper Creek
- Average flow rate: 100 cubic feet (2.8 m^{3}) per second

Malachite Falls is the waterfall formed where the outlet streams of Copper and Malachite lakes plunge parallel for about 600 feet (180 m), before joining together. It stands about 600 feet (180 m) tall, though this measurement is approximate. Despite the grand size of the falls, only portions of it are visible from any given spot, though the falls is visible for about 1 mile (1.6 km) along the West Fork Foss Trail (#1062). The segment of the falls that flows from Copper Lake is easiest to see, while the segment from Malachite Lake is more difficult to see. The falls' best flows are from May to August.

The falls is reached by the West Fork Foss Trail #1062. The total hiking distance to the falls is about 2 miles (3.2 km), with several stream crossings by log bridges.

=== Upper Copper Falls ===
Upper Copper Falls
- Interactive map of Upper Copper Falls
- Coordinates: 47.61197°N 121.31885°W
- Type: Segmented
- Elevation: 2,491 feet (759 m)
- Total height: 40 feet (12 m)
- Number of drops: 1
- Longest drop: 40 feet (12 m)
- Total width: 20 feet (6.1 m)
- Watercourse: Copper Creek
- Average flow rate: 125 cubic feet (3.5 m^{3}) per second

Upper Copper Falls is the first of the three Copper Falls along Copper Creek. Well downstream from the much larger Malachite Falls and Copper Lake Falls, the segmented falls is about 40 feet (12 m) high, and quite photogenic. One segment of the falls probably dries up during lower stream flows, as it most probably cascades over talus. The falls' best flows are perennial.

Below the main falls, there is another 4 feet (1.2 m) drop over a bulbous rock ledge.

The falls is visible from the West Fork Foss Lakes trail. After about 2 miles (3.2 km) from the trailhead, the falls is visible through trees. Several 200 feet (61 m) long paths lead upstream to the base of the falls.

=== Middle Copper Falls ===
Middle Copper Falls
- Interactive map of Middle Copper Falls
- Coordinates: 47.61214°N 121.31695°W
- Type: Tiered
- Elevation: 2,289 feet (698 m)
- Total height: 50 feet (15 m)
- Number of drops: 2
- Longest drop: 30 feet (9.1 m)
- Total width: 15 feet (4.6 m)
- Watercourse: Copper Creek
- Average flow rate: 125 cubic feet (3.5 m^{3}) per second

Middle Copper Falls is the second of the three Copper Falls. It drops about 50 feet (15 m) over smooth, wide rock, and its highest drop is 30 feet (9.1 m). During normal flows, its two tiers are said to be extremely pretty. In flood, the falls becomes a single white sheet of water. The falls look very different from opposite banks of the stream.

Uniquely, the Foss River trail crosses the creek between Upper and Middle Copper Falls. Like Upper Copper Falls, several small paths lead down to Copper Creek, to places where one can view the falls.

=== Lower Copper Falls ===
Lower Copper Falls is a 45 feet (14 m) drop through a narrow chute just downstream of the middle falls. However, it is not as easily viewed.

== West Fork Foss River and Upper Valley ==
There are two major falls along the West Fork, as well as one smaller tributary waterfall in the upper section of the valley.

=== Stairstep Falls ===
Stairstep Falls is a small, unspectacular waterfall on an unnamed stream flowing into the West Fork. About 40 feet (12 m) tall, its highest drop is 25 feet (7.6 m) tall. Its name comes from the rock steps it flows over.

== Lower Valley ==
There are two tall but volume-lacking, glacially fed cascades in the lower part of the valley. One is over 1,000 feet (300 m) tall.

== Above Delta Lake ==
Three large waterfalls flow from Big Heart, Angeline, and Otter lakes, and bear the same name.

=== Otter Lake Falls ===
Otter Lake Falls is known to flow out of Otter Lake, which is adjacent to Angeline Lake.

== See also ==
- Alpine Lakes Wilderness Area
- List of waterfalls
