= Foss River =

- Location of the mouth of the Foss River in Washington Foss River (the United States)

Location
- Country: United States
- State: Washington
- County: King

Physical characteristics
- Source: Confluence of West and East Forks
  - location: Cascade Range
  - coordinates: 47°39′10″N 121°17′32″W
- Mouth: Skykomish River
  - coordinates: 47°42′18″N 121°18′21″W
  - elevation: 1,024 ft (312 m)

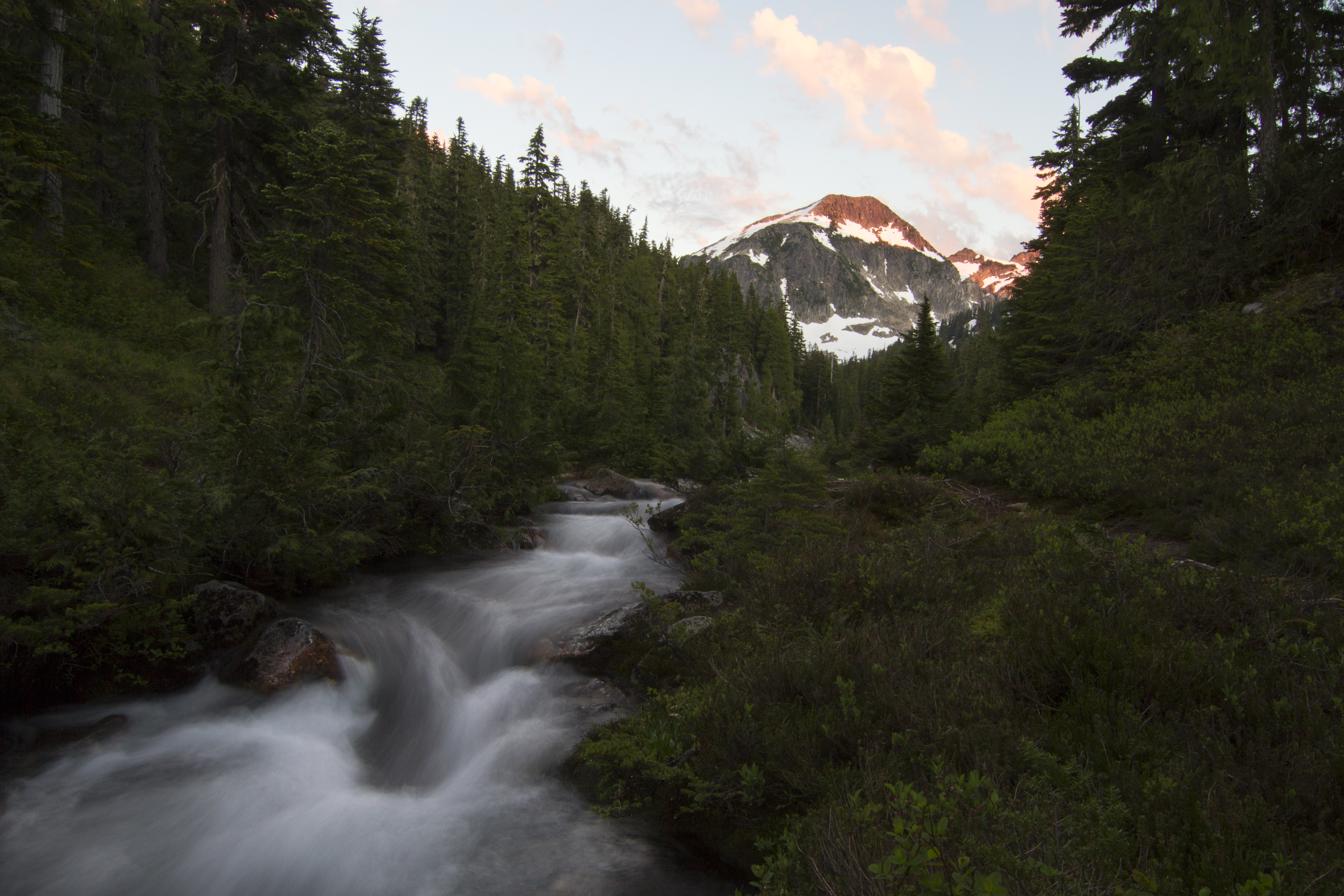
East Fork Foss River

The Foss River is a stream in the U.S. state of Washington. It has two main forks, the East Fork Foss River and the West Fork Foss River. The main stem is formed by the confluence of the two forks. The river and its forks rise near in the Alpine Lakes Wilderness area of Mount Baker-Snoqualmie National Forest in the Cascade Mountains and flows generally north, joining the Tye River to form the South Fork Skykomish River. The Foss River's waters eventually empty into Puget Sound near Everett via the Skykomish River and Snohomish River.

== East Fork ==
The East Fork Foss River originates at 47°34′41″N 121°10′53″W, from the meltwater of Lynch Glacier on the north slope of Mount Daniel. It gathers tributaries from glaciers on the north slope of Mount Hinman as well as tributaries flowing from the lakes of Necklace Valley such as Lake Ilswoot, Locket Lake, Opal Lake, La Bohn Lakes, Alturas Lake, and others. The East Fork Foss River flows generally north, joining the West Fork to form the main stem Foss River.

== West Fork ==
The West Fork Foss River originates at 47°33′29″N 121°17′24″W, from a small glacier and lake on the north side of Iron Cap Mountain. It flows north through a series of lakes including Otter Lake, Delta Lake, and Trout Lake. Its numerous tributaries likewise flow through many lakes in the heart of the Alpine Lakes Wilderness. Leaving the lakes region the West Fork flows generally north, joining the East Fork to form the main stem Foss River.

== See also ==
- List of rivers of Washington (state)
