= Lila Lake =

Lake in Washington, United States

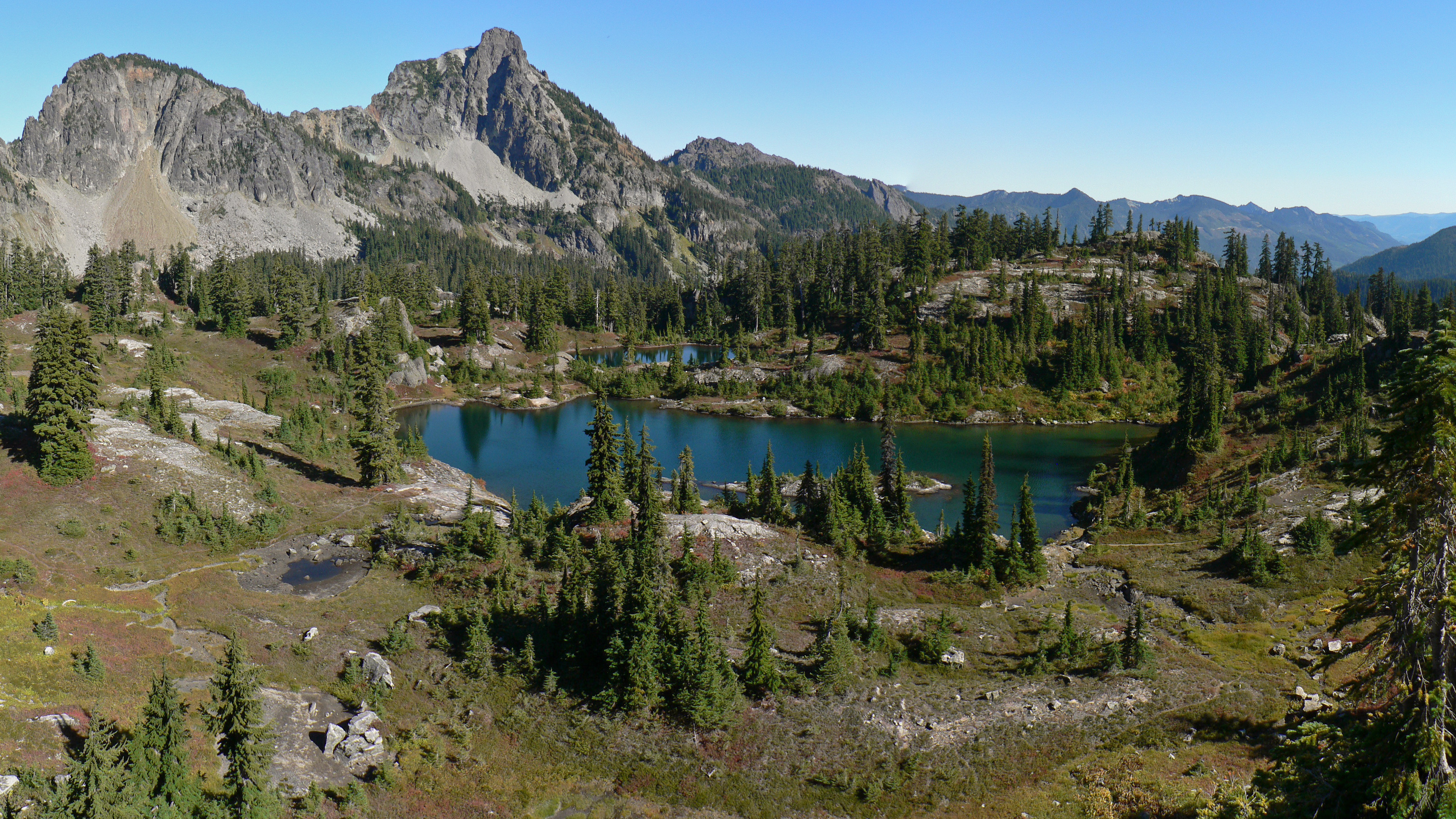
- Lila Lake on Rampart Ridge, Hibox Mountain on the background

- Location within Washington (state) Location within the United States
- Location: Kittitas County, Washington, United States
- Coordinates: 47.4315038°N 121.3253354°W
- Basin countries: United States
- Surface area: 2.8 acres (0.011 km^{2})
- Surface elevation: 5,197 ft (1,584 m)

Lila Lake is a freshwater reservoir lake located on the south slope of Alta Mountain, in Kittitas County, Washington. Self-issued Alpine Lake Wilderness permit required for transit within the Klonaqua Lakes area. The lake is a popular area for hiking, swimming, and fishing rainbow trout.

== Access ==
Lila Lake is located approximately half a mile north of Rachel Lake and access is obtained as an extension to Rachel Lake Trail #1313. Rampart Lakes are a short distance further south. The trail follows Box Canyon Creek from the trailhead which begins at Forest Road 4930 at the Western shores of Little Kachess Lake, approximately 20 miles east of The Summit at Snoqualmie off Interstate 90.

== See also ==
- List of lakes of the Alpine Lakes Wilderness
