= Four Brothers (Cascade Range) =

Mountain in Washington state, US

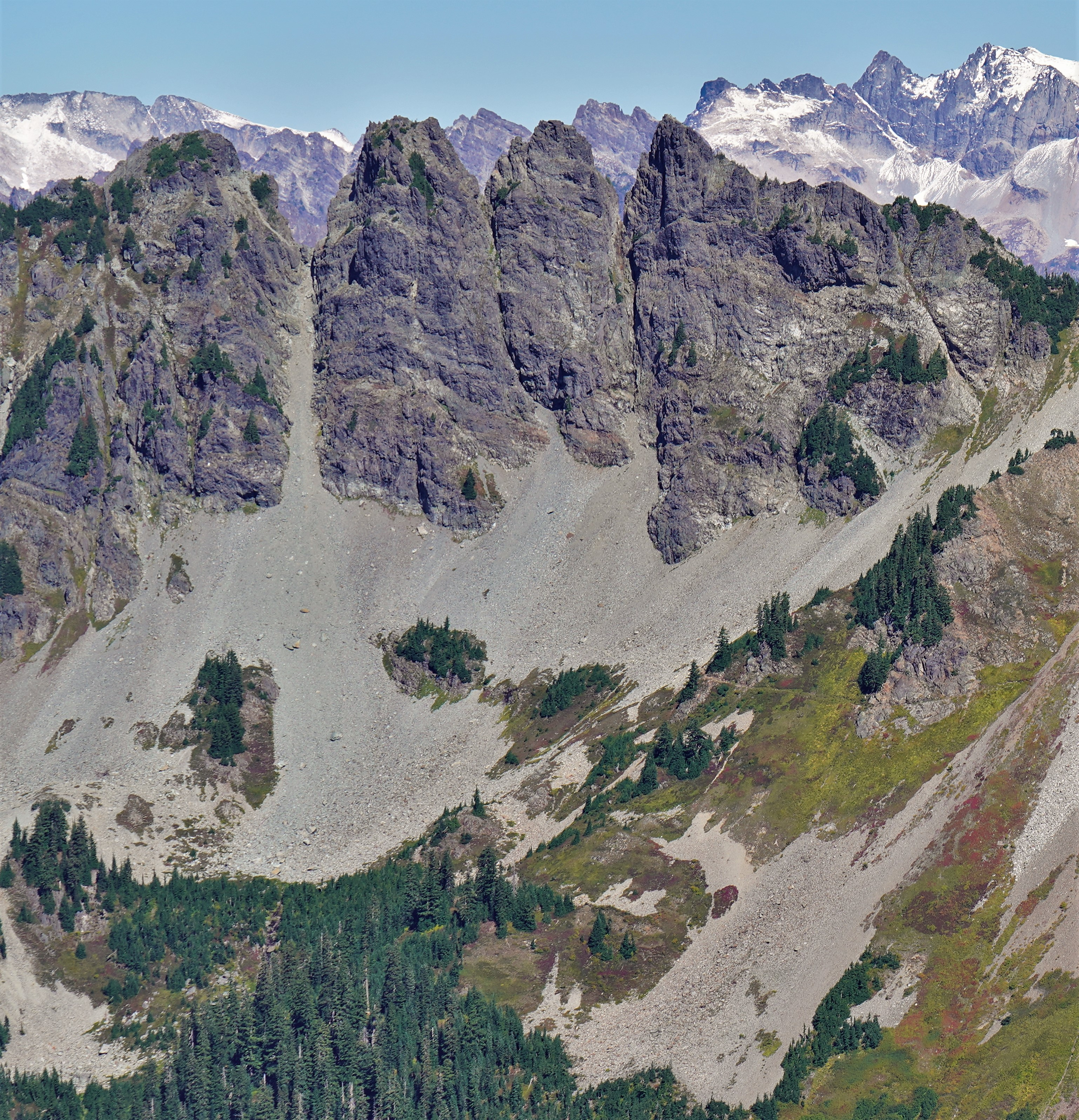
- Southwest aspect, from Alta Mountain

Highest point
- Elevation: 6,485 ft (1,977 m)
- Prominence: 205 ft (62 m)
- Parent peak: Chikamin Peak (7,000+ ft)
- Isolation: 0.73 mi (1.17 km)
- Coordinates: 47°27′57″N 121°18′18″W

Geography
- Location within Washington (state) Location within the United States
- Country: United States
- State: Washington
- County: Kittitas
- Protected area: Alpine Lakes Wilderness
- Parent range: Cascade Range
- Topo map: USGS Chikamin Peak

Climbing
- Easiest route: class 2 Southwest slope

Four Brothers is a 6,485-foot-elevation (1,977-meter) mountain summit located in Kittitas County of Washington state.

== Description ==
Four Brothers is set within the Alpine Lakes Wilderness on land managed by Wenatchee National Forest. Four Brothers is 4 miles (6.4 km) northeast of Snoqualmie Pass, on Chikamin Ridge, 0.73 miles (1.17 km) southeast of its parent, Chikamin Peak. The Pacific Crest Trail traverses the west slope of Four Brothers, and again on the east side as it crosses the gap between Four Brothers and Three Queens. The mountain is part of the Cascade Range and is within the Yakima River drainage basin. Precipitation runoff from the mountain drains west into headwaters of Gold Creek, or east into Glacier Lake. The mountain was named in the 1890s for brothers John, Tom, Vic, and Lawrie Denny, miners who lived in a cabin at the base of the four peaks.

== Climate ==
Four Brothers is located in the marine west coast climate zone of western North America. Most weather fronts originate in the Pacific Ocean, and travel northeast toward the Cascade Mountains. As fronts approach, they are forced upward by the peaks of the Cascade Range, causing them to drop their moisture in the form of rain or snowfall onto the Cascades (Orographic lift). As a result, the west side of the Cascades experiences high precipitation, especially during the winter months in the form of snowfall. During winter months, weather is usually cloudy, but, due to high pressure systems over the Pacific Ocean that intensify during summer months, there is often little or no cloud cover during the summer.

== Geology ==
The Alpine Lakes Wilderness features some of the most rugged topography in the Cascade Range with craggy peaks and ridges, deep glacial valleys, and granite walls spotted with over 700 mountain lakes. Geological events occurring many years ago created the diverse topography and drastic elevation changes over the Cascade Range leading to the various climate differences. These climate differences lead to vegetation variety defining the ecoregions in this area. The elevation range of this area is between about 1,000 feet (300 m) in the lower elevations to over 9,000 feet (2,700 m) on Mount Stuart.

The history of the formation of the Cascade Mountains dates back millions of years ago to the late Eocene Epoch. With the North American Plate overriding the Pacific Plate, episodes of volcanic igneous activity persisted. In addition, small fragments of the oceanic and continental lithosphere called terranes created the North Cascades about 50 million years ago.

During the Pleistocene period dating back over two million years ago, glaciation advancing and retreating repeatedly scoured the landscape leaving deposits of rock debris. The last glacial retreat in the Alpine Lakes area began about 14,000 years ago and was north of the Canada–US border by 10,000 years ago. The U-shaped cross section of the river valleys is a result of that recent glaciation. Uplift and faulting in combination with glaciation have been the dominant processes which have created the tall peaks and deep valleys of the Alpine Lakes Wilderness area.

== Gallery ==
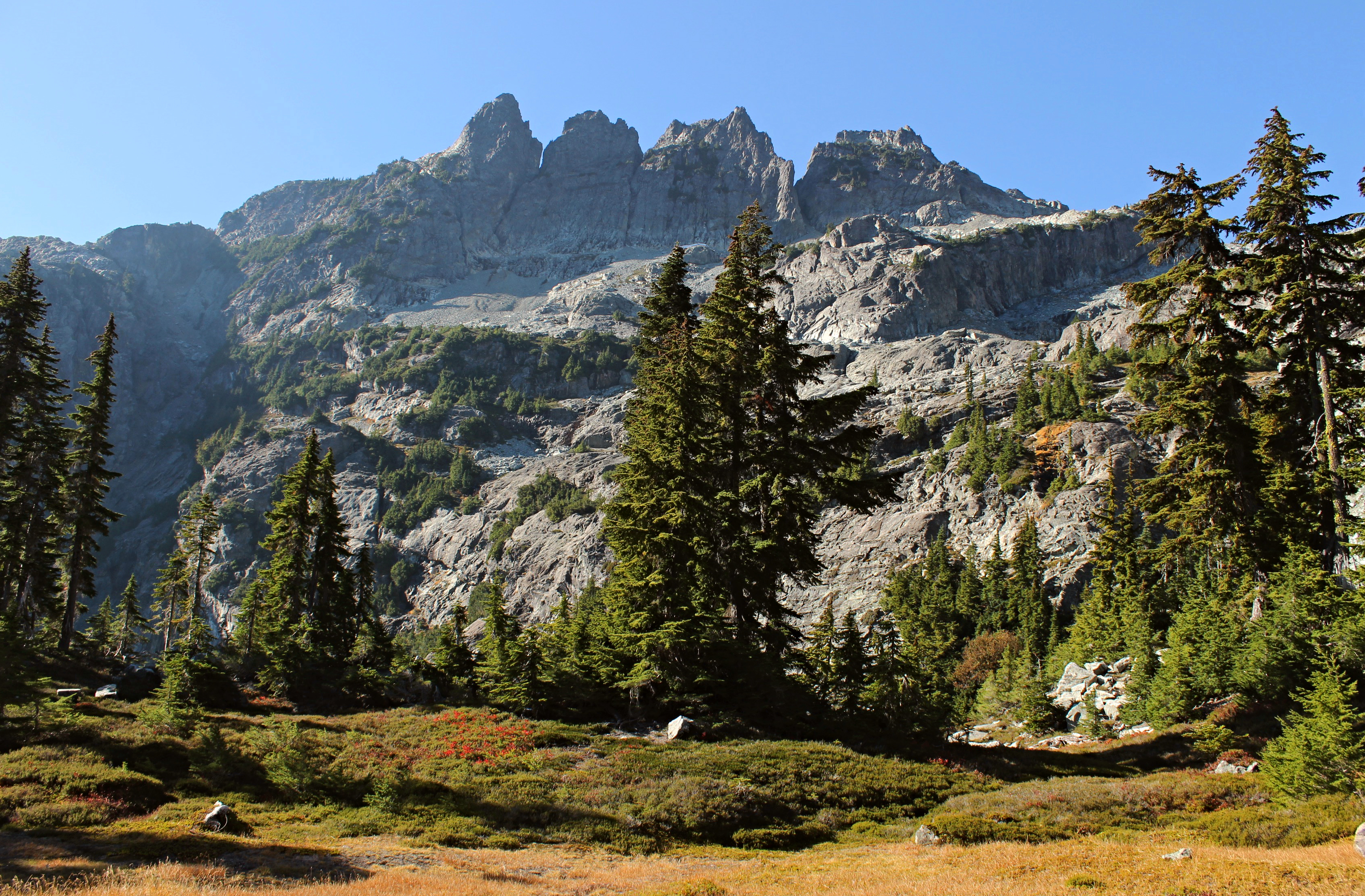
East aspect

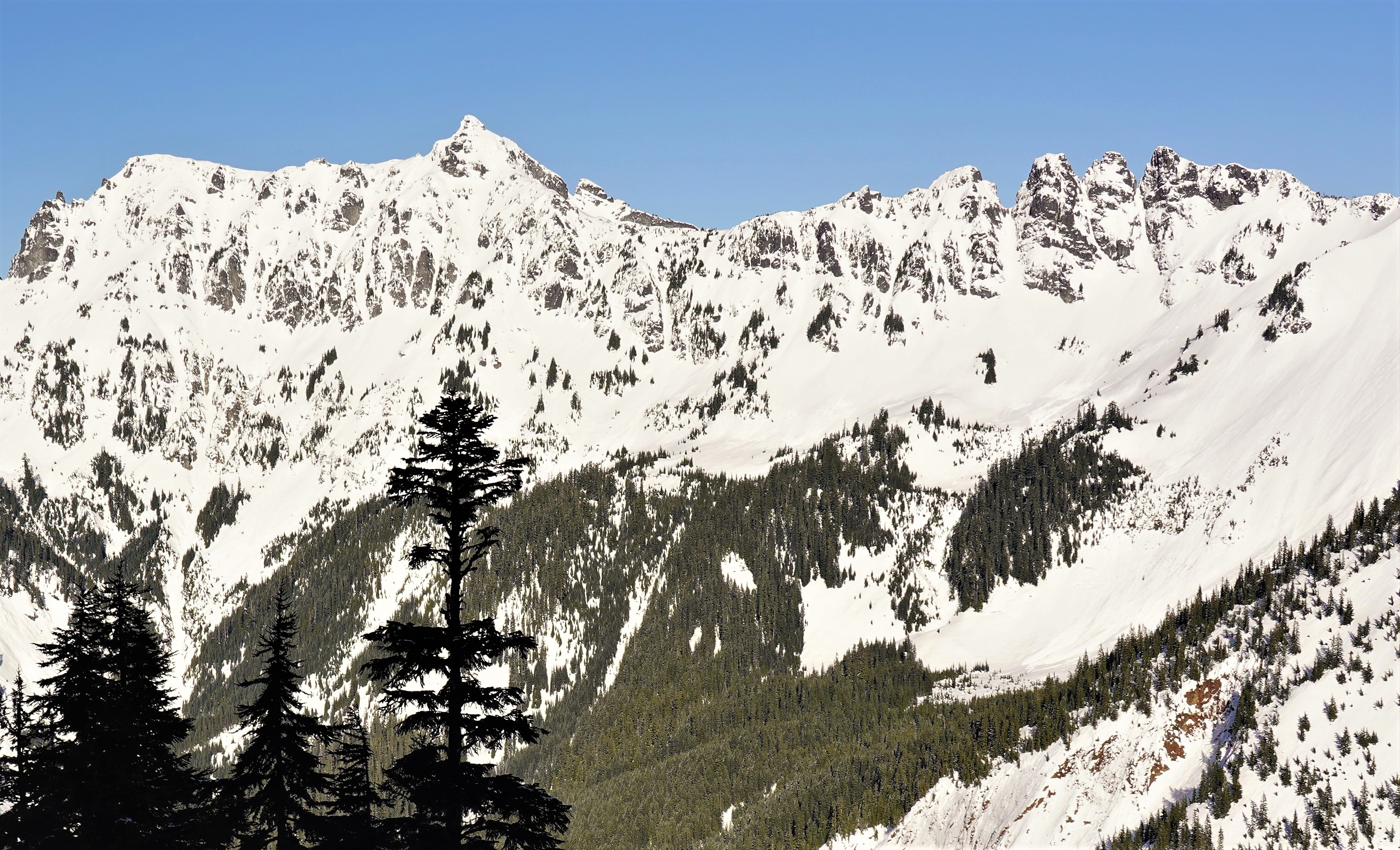
Chikamin Peak and Four Brothers (right) in winter

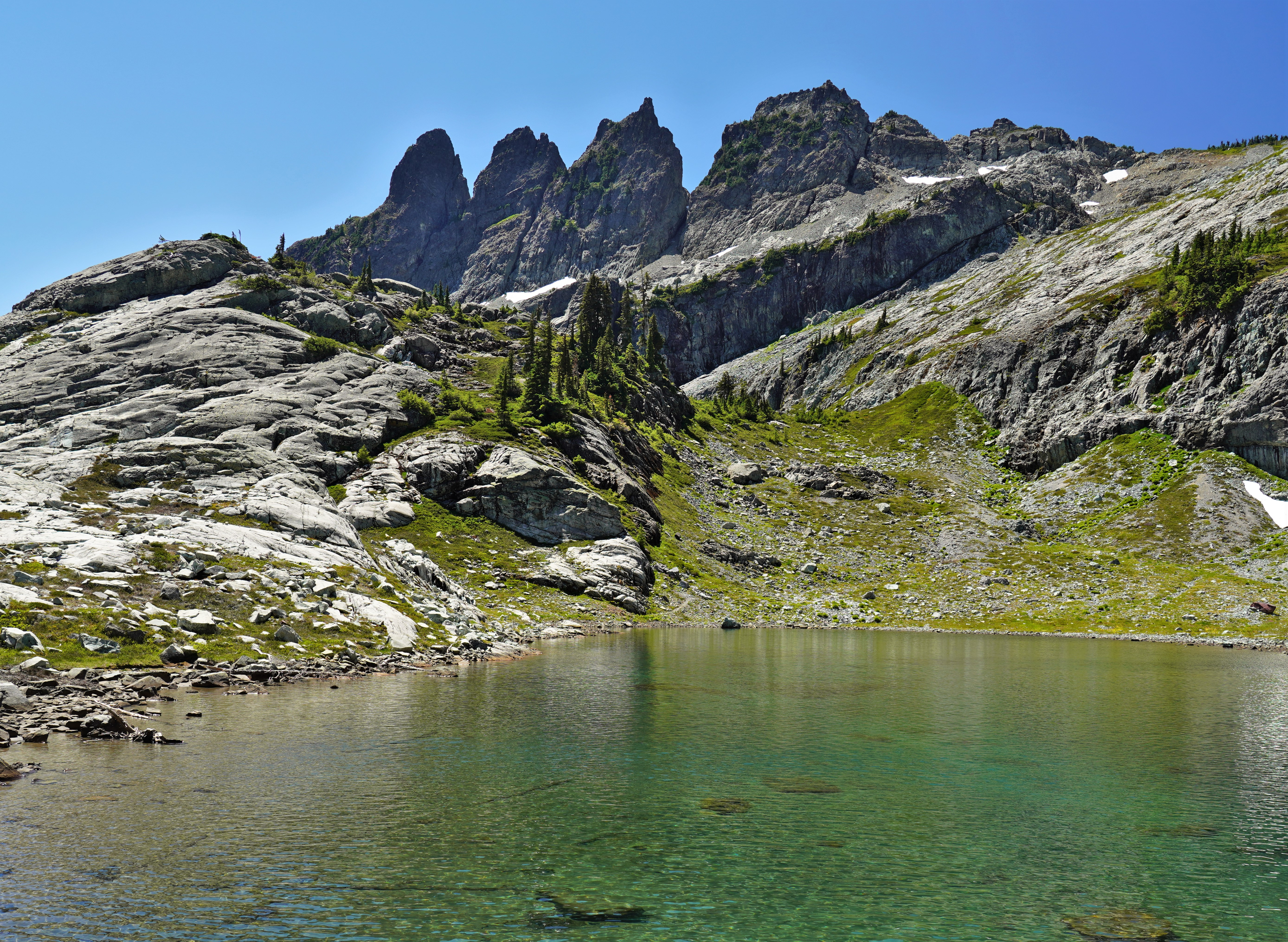
Four Brothers

== See also ==
- List of peaks of the Alpine Lakes Wilderness
