= Three Queens =

Mountain in Washington (state), United States

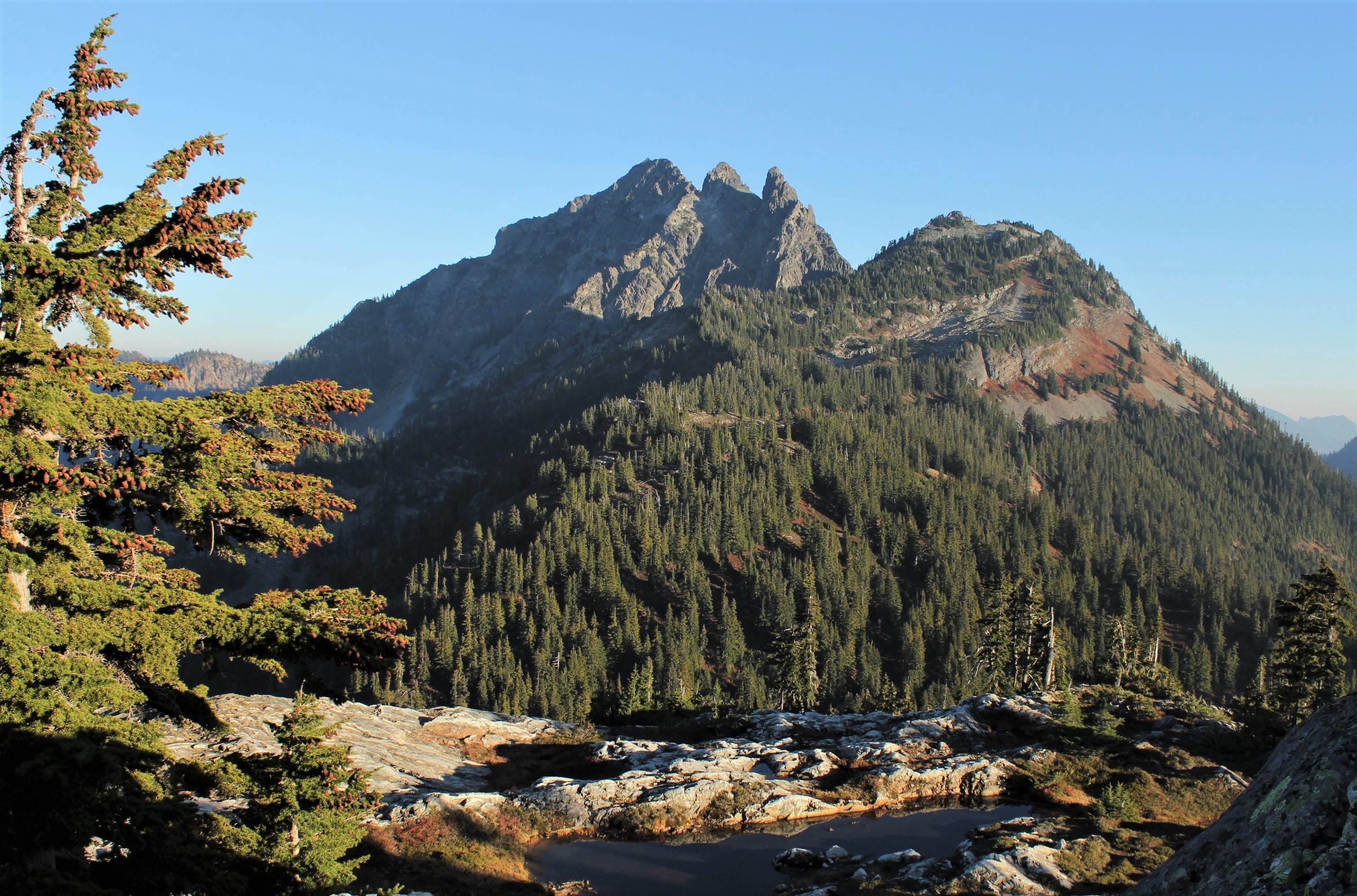
- Three Queens from northwest

Highest point
- Elevation: 6,693 ft (2,040 m)
- Prominence: 1,782 ft (543 m)
- Parent peak: Chikamin Peak (6,994 ft)
- Isolation: 2.78 mi (4.47 km)
- Coordinates: 47°26′47″N 121°16′15″W

Geography
- Location within Washington (state) Location within the United States
- Country: United States
- State: Washington
- County: Kittitas
- Protected area: Alpine Lakes Wilderness
- Parent range: Cascade Range
- Topo map: USGS Chikamin Peak

Climbing
- First ascent: 1925
- Easiest route: class 3+ scrambling

Three Queens is a prominent 6,693-foot (2,040-metre) triple-summit mountain located in the Cascade Range, in Kittitas County of Washington state. It is set within the Alpine Lakes Wilderness on land managed by Wenatchee National Forest. The East Peak is the highest, and its subpeaks are the Middle Peak (6,600 ft; 2,000 m), and West Peak (6,400 ft; 2,000 m). Three Queens is set 6.5 miles (10.5 km) east-northeast of Snoqualmie Pass, on Chikamin Ridge, 2.76 miles (4.44 km) southeast of its nearest higher neighbor, Chikamin Peak. The Pacific Crest Trail traverses the west slope of Three Queens as it crosses the gap between Four Brothers and Three Queens. Precipitation runoff from the mountain drains into tributaries of the Yakima River drainage basin. The first ascent was likely made in 1925 by a party of eight Mountaineers led by Glen Bremerman and C. A. Fisher. This mountain's toponym was officially adopted in 1940 by the United States Board on Geographic Names.

== Climate ==
Three Queens is located in the marine west coast climate zone of westernNorth America. Weather fronts originating in the Pacific Ocean travel northeast toward the Cascade Mountains. As fronts approach, they are forced upward by the peaks of the Cascade Range, causing them to drop their moisture in the form of rain or snow onto the Cascades. As a result, the Cascades experience high precipitation, especially during the winter months in the form of snowfall. During winter months, weather is usually cloudy, but due to high pressure systems over the Pacific Ocean that intensify during summer months, there is often little or no cloud cover during the summer.

== Geology ==
The Alpine Lakes Wilderness features some of the most rugged topography in the Cascade Range with craggy peaks and ridges, deep glacial valleys, and granite walls spotted with over 700 mountain lakes. Geological events occurring many years ago created the diverse topography and drastic elevation changes over the Cascade Range leading to the various climate differences. These climate differences lead to vegetation variety defining the ecoregions in this area. The elevation range of this area is between about 1,000 feet (300 m) in the lower elevations to over 9,000 feet (2,700 m) on Mount Stuart.

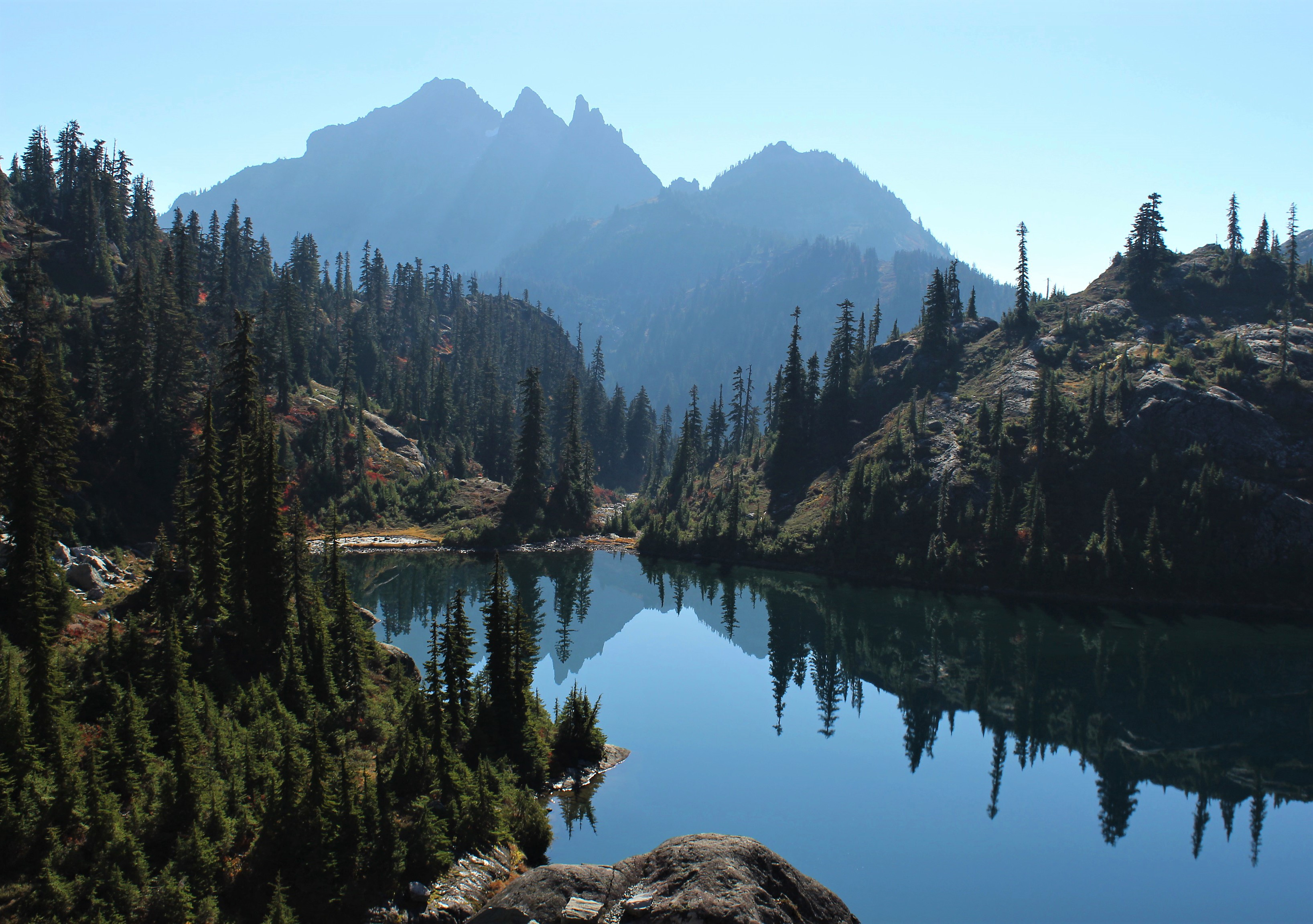
Glacier Lake and Three Queens

The history of the formation of the Cascade Mountains dates back millions of years ago to the late Eocene Epoch. With the North American Plate overriding the Pacific Plate, episodes of volcanic igneous activity persisted. In addition, small fragments of the oceanic and continental lithosphere called terranes created the North Cascades about 50 million years ago.

During the Pleistocene period dating back over two million years ago, glaciation advancing and retreating repeatedly scoured the landscape leaving deposits of rock debris. The last glacial retreat in the Alpine Lakes area began about 14,000 years ago and was north of the Canada–US border by 10,000 years ago. The U-shaped cross section of the river valleys is a result of that recent glaciation. Uplift and faulting in combination with glaciation have been the dominant processes which have created the tall peaks and deep valleys of the Alpine Lakes Wilderness area.

== See also ==
- List of peaks of the Alpine Lakes Wilderness
- Geography of Washington (state)
