= Rampart Lakes =

Lake in Washington, United States

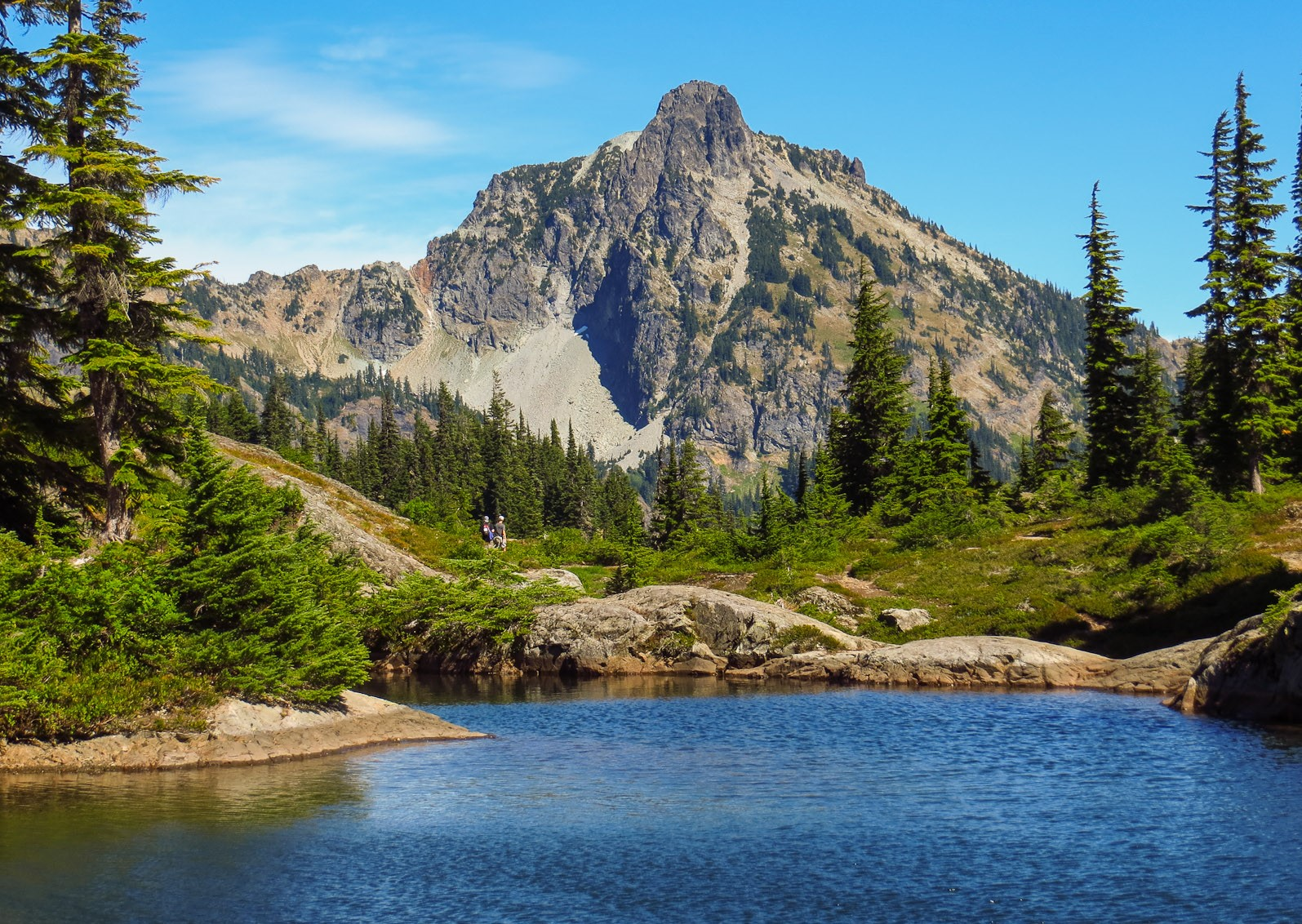
- Hibox Mountain from Rampart Lakes area

- Location within Washington (state) Location within the United States
- Location: Kittitas County, Washington, United States
- Coordinates: 47.4157129°N 121.3404298°W
- Basin countries: United States
- Surface area: 6.3 acres (0.025 km^{2})
- Surface elevation: 5,082 ft (1,549 m)

Rampart Lakes area a set of contiguous freshwater reservoir lakes located on the south slope of Alta Mountain, in Kittitas County, Washington. Self-issued Alpine Lake Wilderness permit required for transit within the Klonaqua Lakes area. The lake is a popular area for hiking, swimming, and fishing cutthroat trout.

== Climate ==
Rampart Lakes are in a hemiboreal climate. The average temperature is 4 °C. The warmest month is August, with an average temperature of 17 °C, and the coldest month is January, at an average of −8 °C. Temperatures and precipitation are similar to surrounding lakes of the Alpine Lakes Wilderness. The wettest month is January, with 396 millimeters of rain, and the least in July, with 38 millimeters of rain.

== Access ==
Rampart Lakes are located approximately one mile west of Rachel Lake and access is obtained as an extension to Rachel Lake Trail #1313. The trail follows Box Canyon Creek from the trailhead which begins at Forest Road 4930 at the Western shores of Little Kachess Lake, approximately 20 miles east of The Summit at Snoqualmie off Interstate 90.

== See also ==
- List of lakes of the Alpine Lakes Wilderness
