= Rachel Lake =

Lake in Kittitas County, Washington, USA

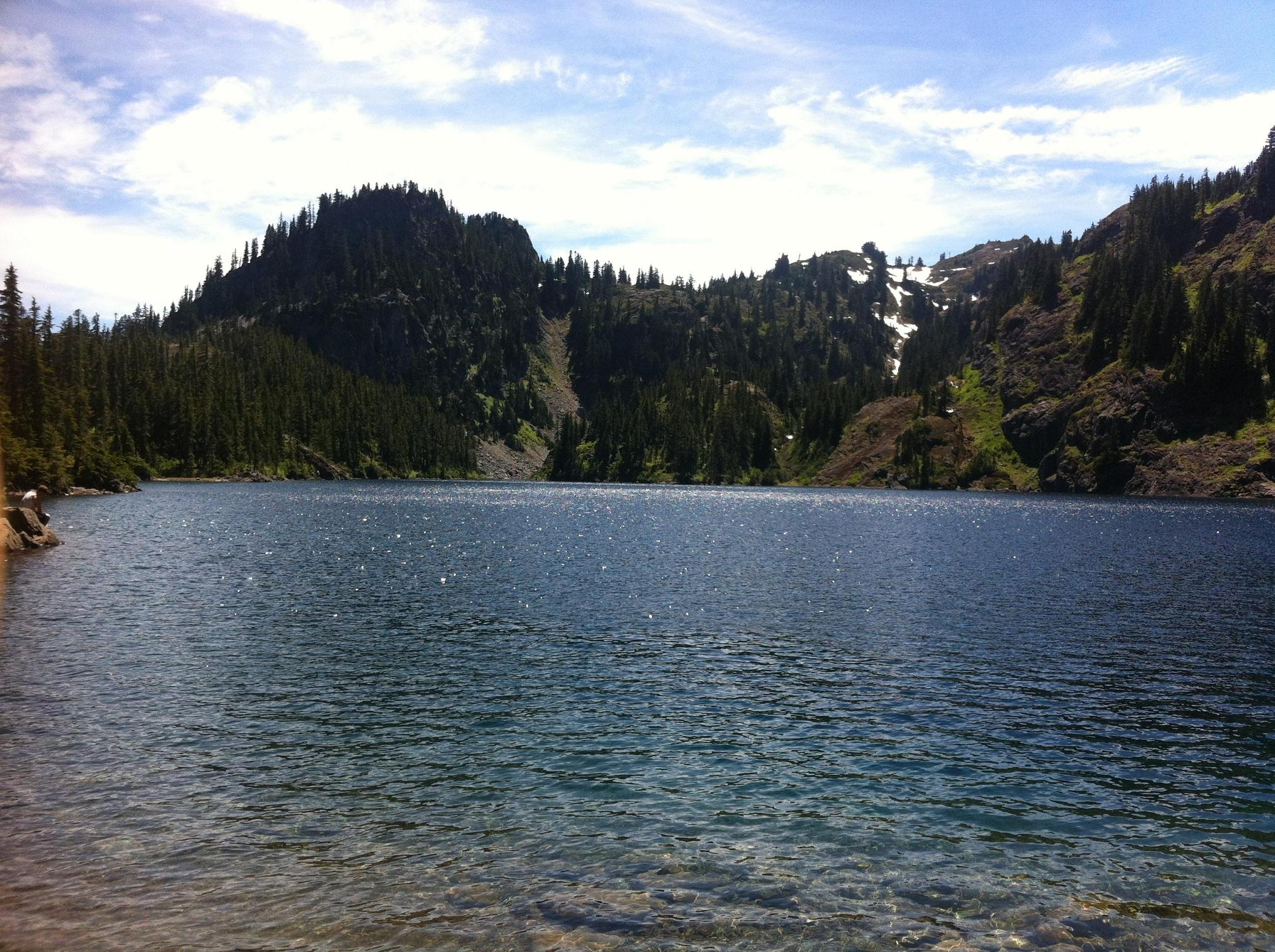

- Location within Washington (state) Location within the United States
- Location: Kittitas County, Washington
- Coordinates: 47°25′14″N 121°19′52″W
- Basin countries: United States
- Surface area: 25.1 acres (10.2 ha)
- Surface elevation: 4,665 ft (1,422 m)
- Islands: 0

Rachel Lake is located on the eastern side of Rampart Ridge in Kittitas County, Washington. The lake is a popular area for hiking, swimming, and fishing cutthroat trout.

== Access ==
Access to Rachel Lake is obtained by Rachel Lake Trail #1313, approximately 4 miles from the trailhead and which continues north to Lila Lake. The trail follows Box Canyon Creek from the trailhead which begins at Forest Road 4930 at the Western shores of Little Kachess Lake, approximately 20 miles east of The Summit at Snoqualmie off Interstate 90.

== See also ==
- List of lakes of the Alpine Lakes Wilderness
