= Hibox Mountain =

Mountain in Washington (state), United States

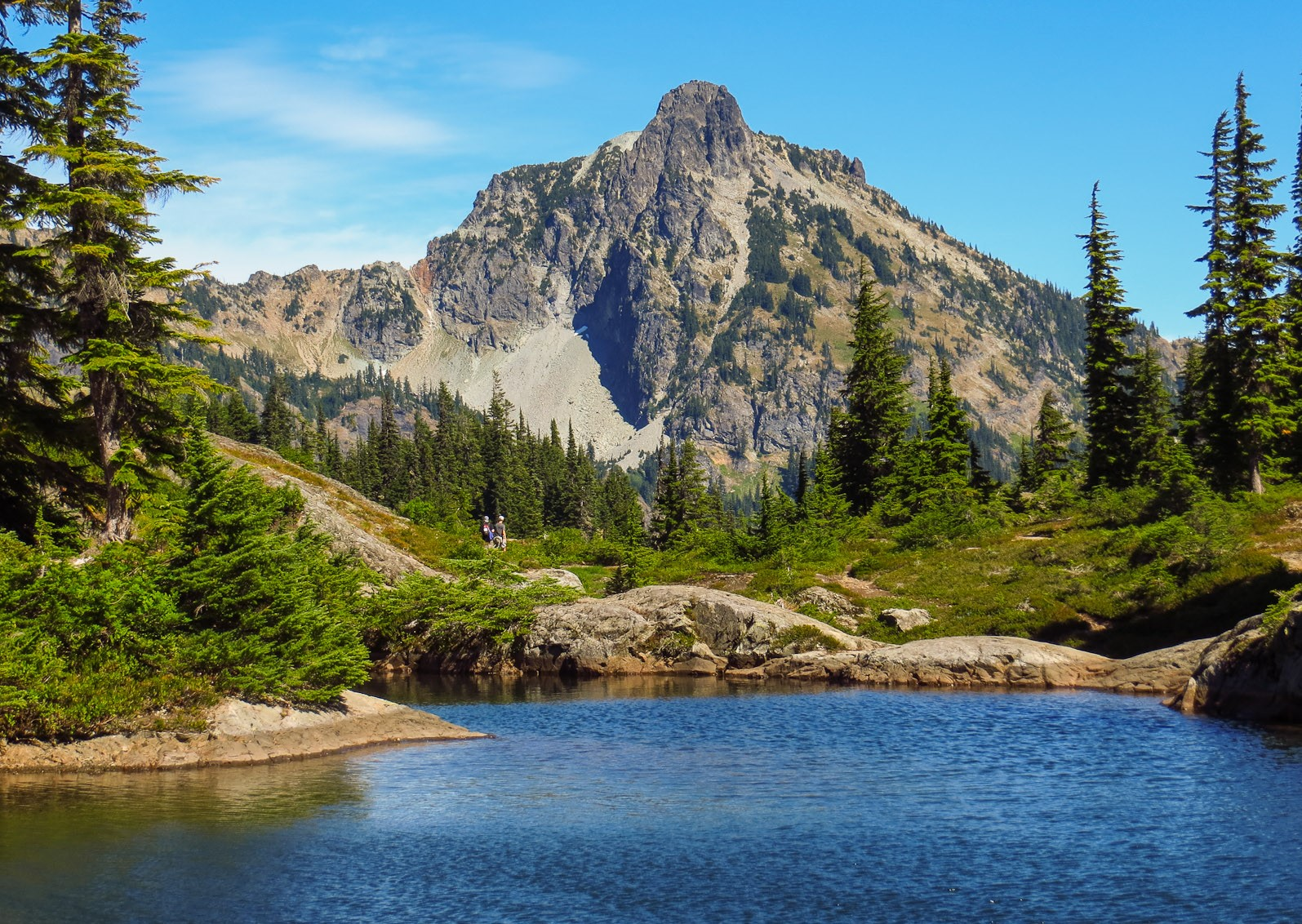
- Hibox Mountain from Rampart Lakes area

Highest point
- Elevation: 6,550 ft (1,996 m)
- Prominence: 1,052 ft (321 m)
- Parent peak: Chikamin Peak (7,020 ft)
- Isolation: 1.75 mi (2.82 km)
- Coordinates: 47°25′54″N 121°18′03″W

Geography
- Location within Washington (state) Location within the United States
- Country: United States
- State: Washington
- County: Kittitas
- Protected area: Alpine Lakes Wilderness
- Parent range: Cascade Range
- Topo map: USGS Chikamin Peak

Climbing
- Easiest route: Scrambling

Hibox Mountain is a 6,550-foot (1,996-metre) mountain summit located in the Cascade Range in Kittitas County of Washington state. It is situated within the Alpine Lakes Wilderness on land managed by Okanogan-Wenatchee National Forest. The mountain's name "Hibox" is a portmanteau which is derived from its position as the high point of Box Ridge. The peak is five miles east of Snoqualmie Pass, and Alta Mountain lies 1.5 miles to the west-northwest of Hibox. Precipitation runoff from the mountain drains into Box Canyon Creek and Mineral Creek which both empty to Kachess Lake. Topographic relief is significant as the summit rises 3,250 feet (991 meters) above Box Canyon in one mile (1.6 km).

== Climate ==
Hibox Mountain is located in the marine west coast climate zone of western North America. Weather fronts originating in the Pacific Ocean travel northeast toward the Cascade Mountains. As fronts approach, they are forced upward by the peaks of the Cascade Range (orographic lift), causing them to drop their moisture in the form of rain or snow onto the Cascades. As a result, the Cascades experience high precipitation, especially during the winter months in the form of snowfall. Because of maritime influence, snow tends to be wet and heavy, resulting in avalanche danger. During winter months, weather is usually cloudy, but due to high pressure systems over the Pacific Ocean that intensify during summer months, there is often little or no cloud cover during the summer.

== Geology ==
The Alpine Lakes Wilderness features some of the most rugged topography in the Cascade Range with craggy peaks and ridges, deep glacial valleys, and granite walls spotted with over 700 mountain lakes. Geological events occurring many years ago created the diverse topography and drastic elevation changes over the Cascade Range leading to the various climate differences. These climate differences lead to vegetation variety defining the ecoregions in this area. The elevation range of this area is between about 1,000 feet (300 m) in the lower elevations to over 9,000 feet (2,700 m) on Mount Stuart.

The history of the formation of the Cascade Mountains dates back millions of years ago to the late Eocene Epoch. With the North American Plate overriding the Pacific Plate, episodes of volcanic igneous activity persisted. In addition, small fragments of the oceanic and continental lithosphere called terranes created the North Cascades about 50 million years ago.

During the Pleistocene period dating back over two million years ago, glaciation advancing and retreating repeatedly scoured the landscape leaving deposits of rock debris. The last glacial retreat in the Alpine Lakes area began about 14,000 years ago and was north of the Canada–US border by 10,000 years ago. The U-shaped cross section of the river valleys is a result of that recent glaciation. Uplift and faulting in combination with glaciation have been the dominant processes which have created the tall peaks and deep valleys of the Alpine Lakes Wilderness area.

== See also ==
- List of peaks of the Alpine Lakes Wilderness
- Geology of the Pacific Northwest

== Gallery ==
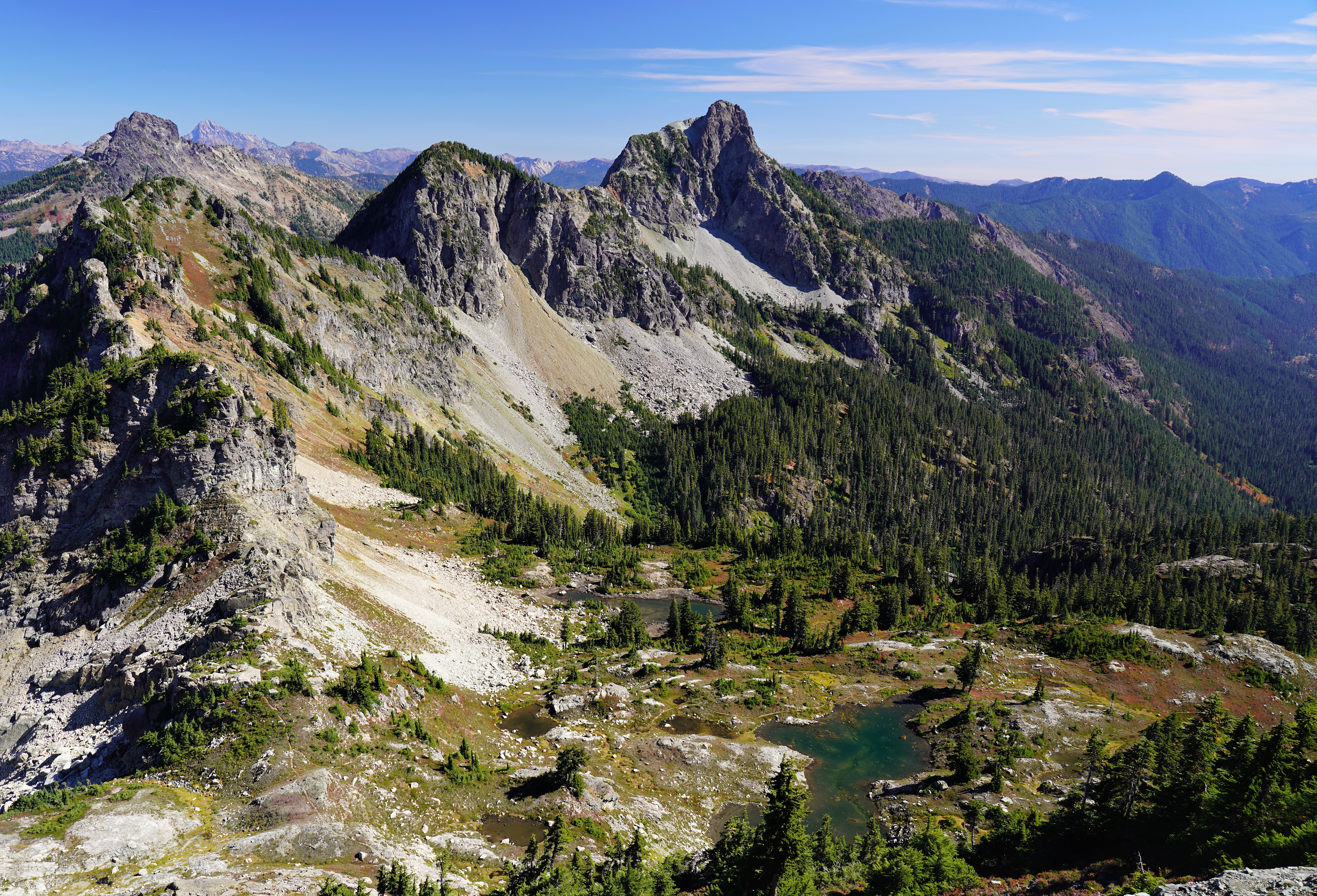
Hibox Mountain

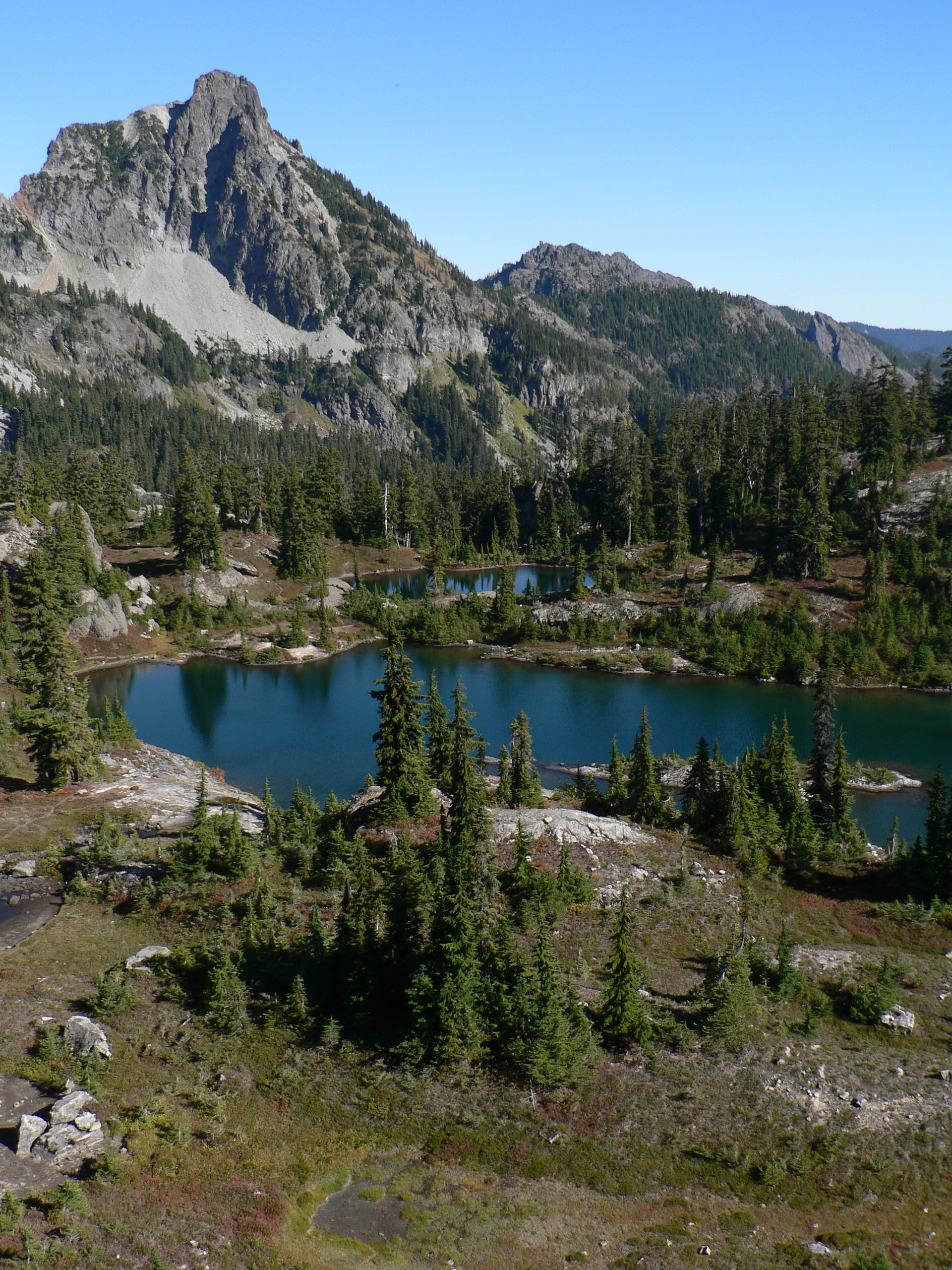
Lila Lake and Hibox Mountain

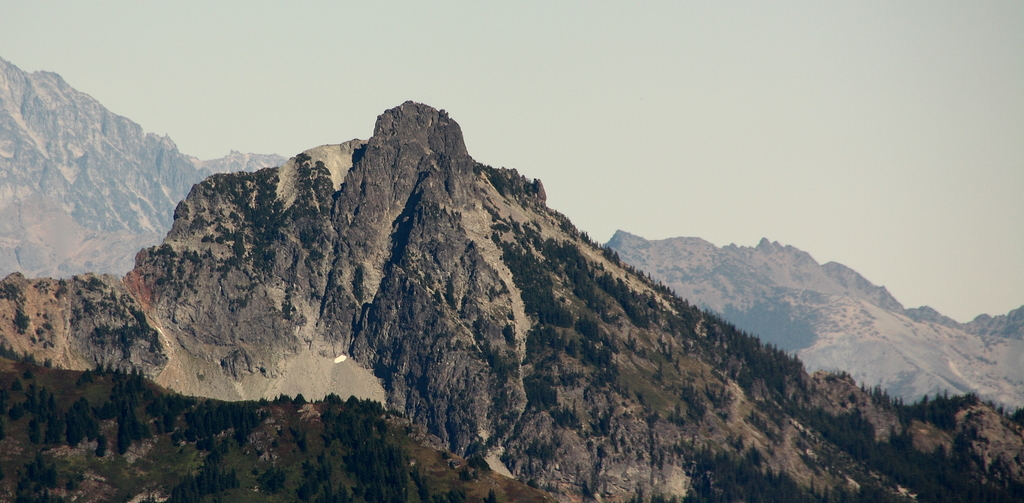
