= Alta Mountain =

Mountain in Washington state

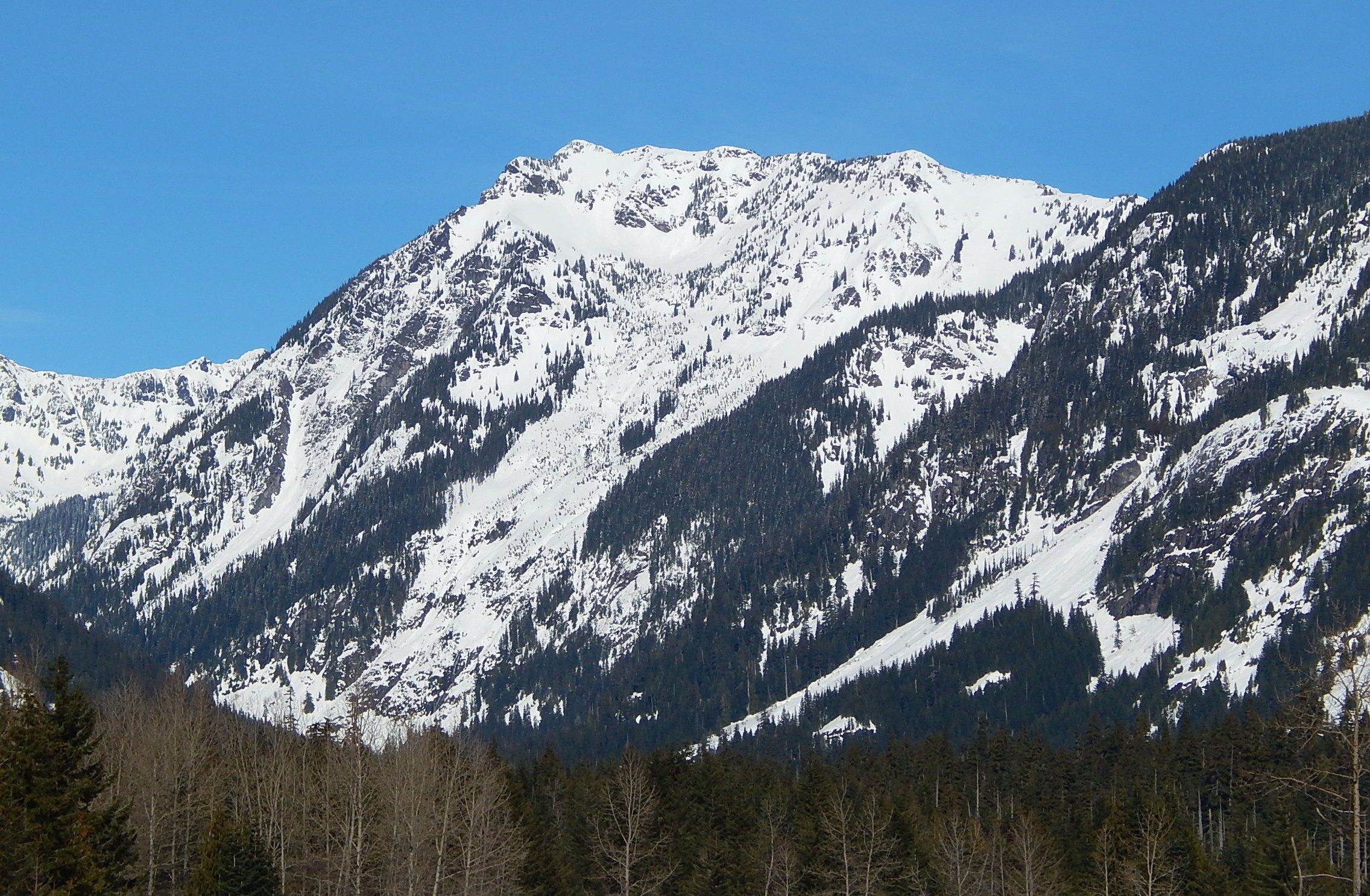
- Alta Mountain seen from Interstate 90 at Hyak

Highest point
- Elevation: 6,275 ft (1,913 m)
- Prominence: 585 ft (178 m)
- Parent peak: Hibox Mountain (6,550 ft)
- Isolation: 1.59 mi (2.56 km)
- Coordinates: 47°26′28″N 121°19′55″W

Geography
- Location within Washington (state) Location within the United States
- Interactive map of Alta Mountain
- Country: United States
- State: Washington
- County: Kittitas
- Protected area: Alpine Lakes Wilderness
- Parent range: Cascade Range
- Topo map: USGS Chikamin Peak

Climbing
- Easiest route: Scrambling (class 2) South Ridge

Alta Mountain is a 6,275-foot (1,913-metre) mountain summit located in Kittitas County of Washington state. It is set within the Alpine Lakes Wilderness which is part of the Cascade Range. Alta Mountain is situated on land managed by Wenatchee National Forest. Precipitation runoff from the mountain drains into tributaries of the Yakima River.

== Climate ==
Alta Mountain is located in the marine west coast climate zone of western North America. Weather fronts originating in the Pacific Ocean travel northeast toward the Cascade Mountains. As fronts approach, they are forced upward by the peaks of the Cascade Range, causing them to drop their moisture in the form of rain or snow onto the Cascades (Orographic lift). As a result, the west side of the Cascades experiences high precipitation, especially during the winter months in the form of snowfall. Because of maritime influence, snow tends to be wet and heavy, resulting in high avalanche danger. During winter months, weather is usually cloudy, but due to high pressure systems over the Pacific Ocean that intensify during summer months, there is often little or no cloud cover during the summer. The months of July through September offer the most favorable weather for viewing or climbing this peak.

== Geology ==
The Alpine Lakes Wilderness features some of the most rugged topography in the Cascade Range with craggy peaks and ridges, deep glacial valleys, and granite walls spotted with over 700 mountain lakes. Geological events occurring many years ago created the diverse topography and drastic elevation changes over the Cascade Range leading to the various climate differences. These climate differences lead to vegetation variety defining the ecoregions in this area.

The history of the formation of the Cascade Mountains dates back millions of years ago to the late Eocene Epoch. With the North American Plate overriding the Pacific Plate, episodes of volcanic igneous activity persisted. In addition, small fragments of the oceanic and continental lithosphere called terranes created the North Cascades about 50 million years ago.

During the Pleistocene period dating back over two million years ago, glaciation advancing and retreating repeatedly scoured the landscape leaving deposits of rock debris. The last glacial retreat in the Alpine Lakes area began about 14,000 years ago and was north of the Canada–US border by 10,000 years ago. The U-shaped cross section of the river valleys is a result of that recent glaciation. Uplift and faulting in combination with glaciation have been the dominant processes which have created the tall peaks and deep valleys of the Alpine Lakes Wilderness area.

== Gallery ==
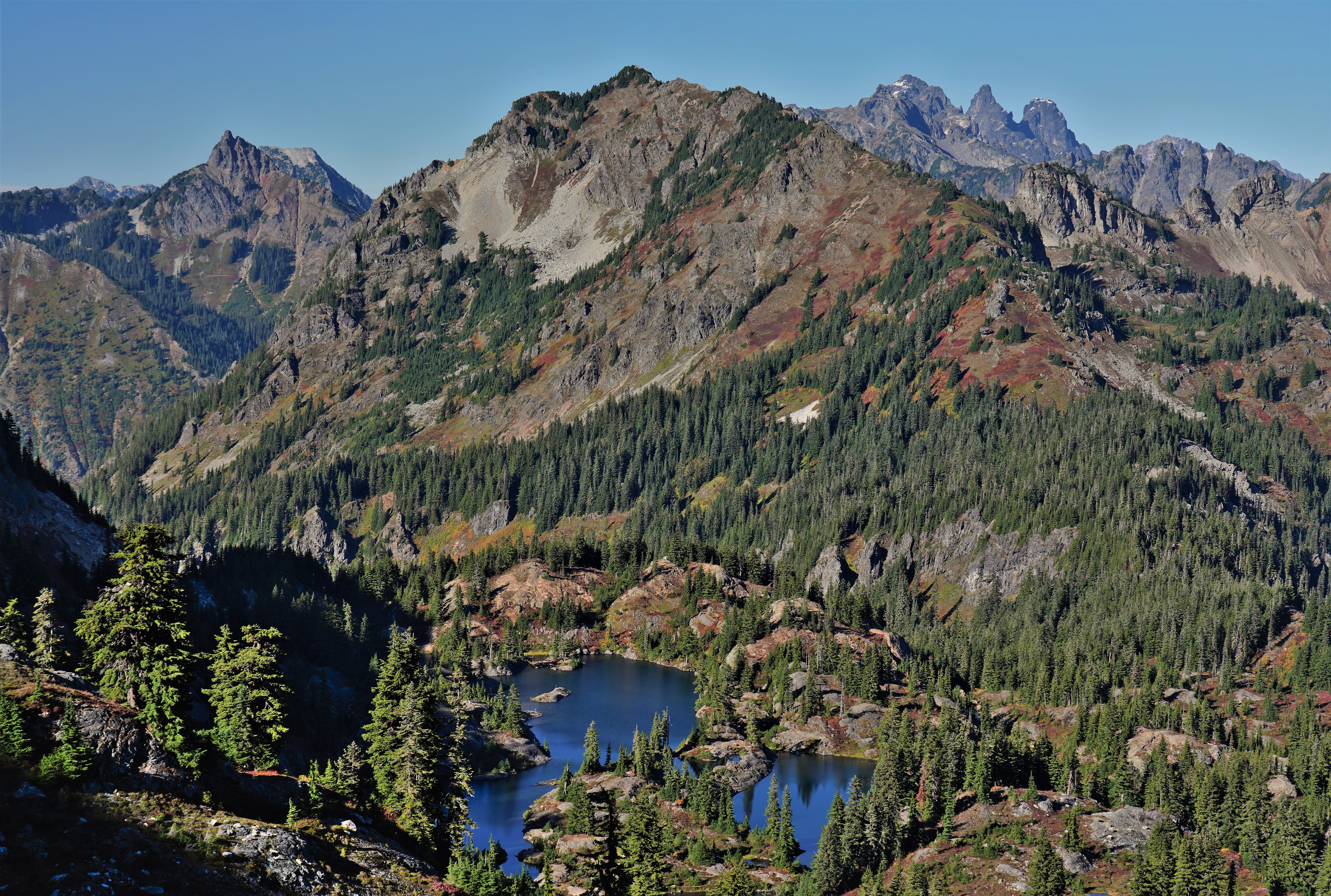
Alta Mountain and Rampart Lakes

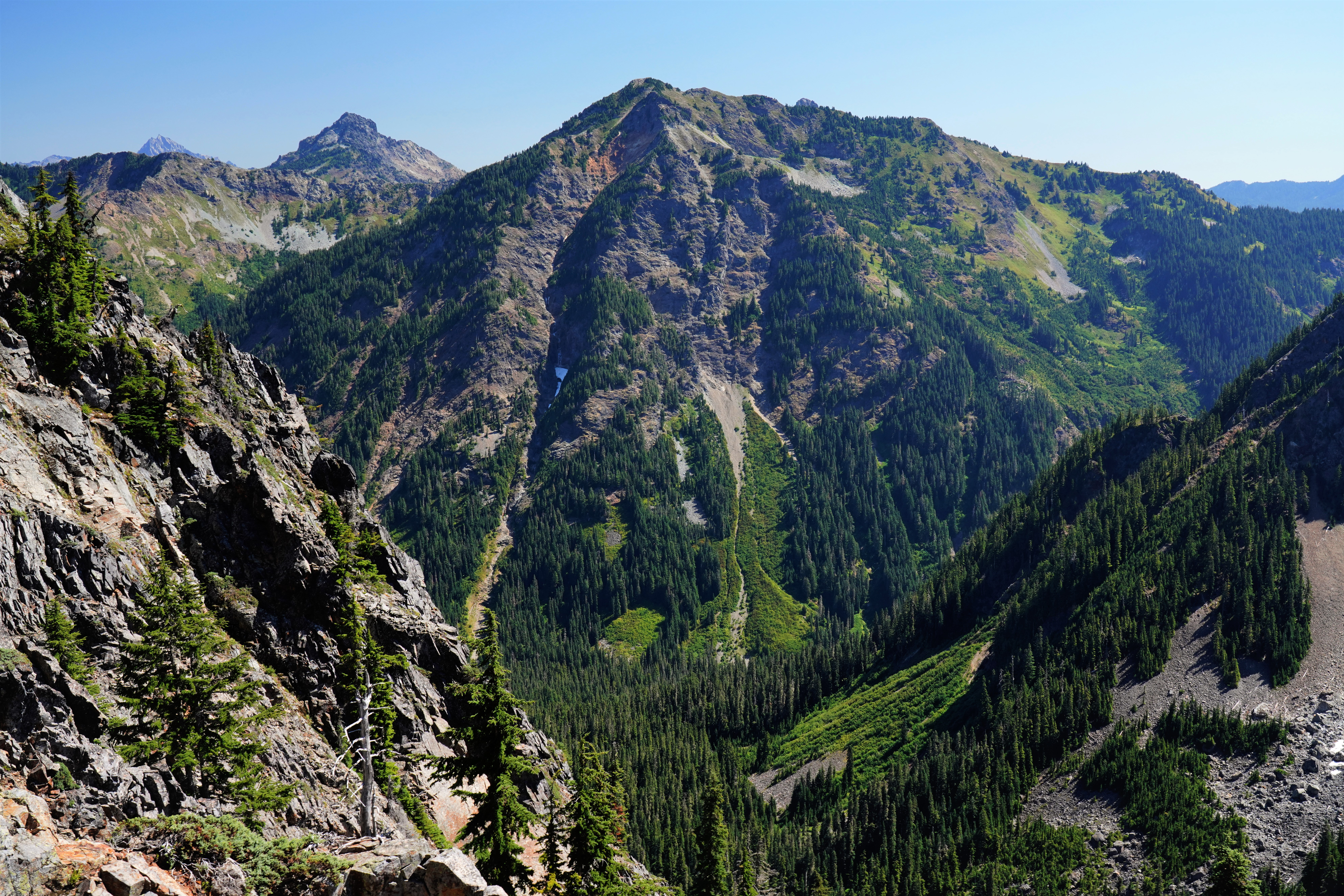
West aspect, from Kendall Katwalk

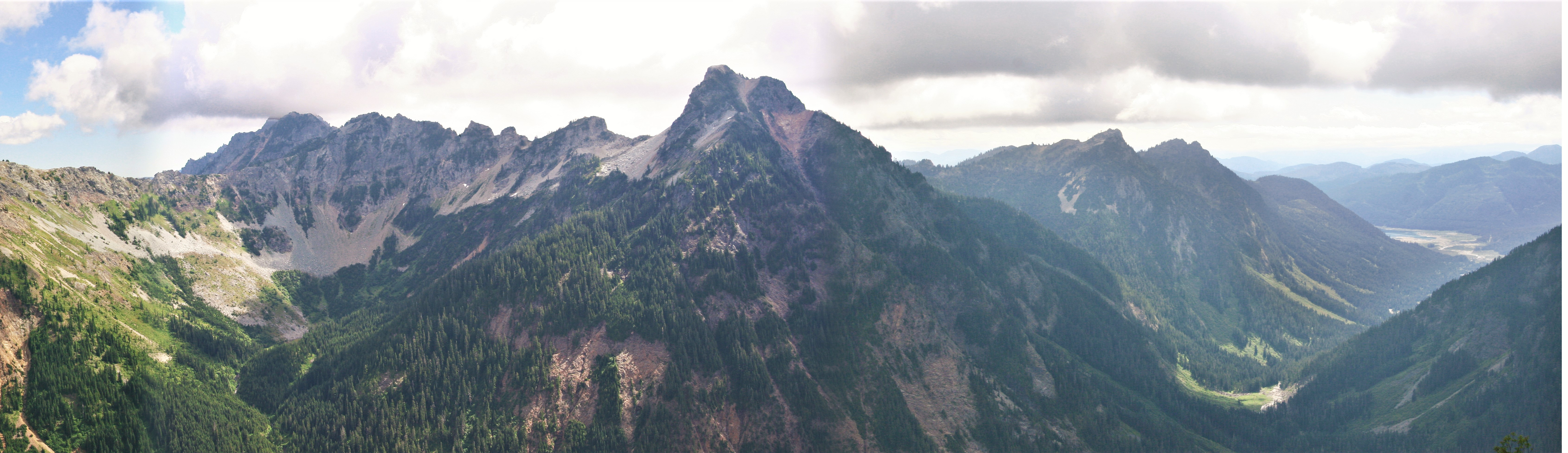
Alta Mountain from the north

== See also ==
- Geography of Washington (state)
- Geology of the Pacific Northwest
- List of peaks of the Alpine Lakes Wilderness
