= Guye Peak =

Mountain in Washington (state), United States

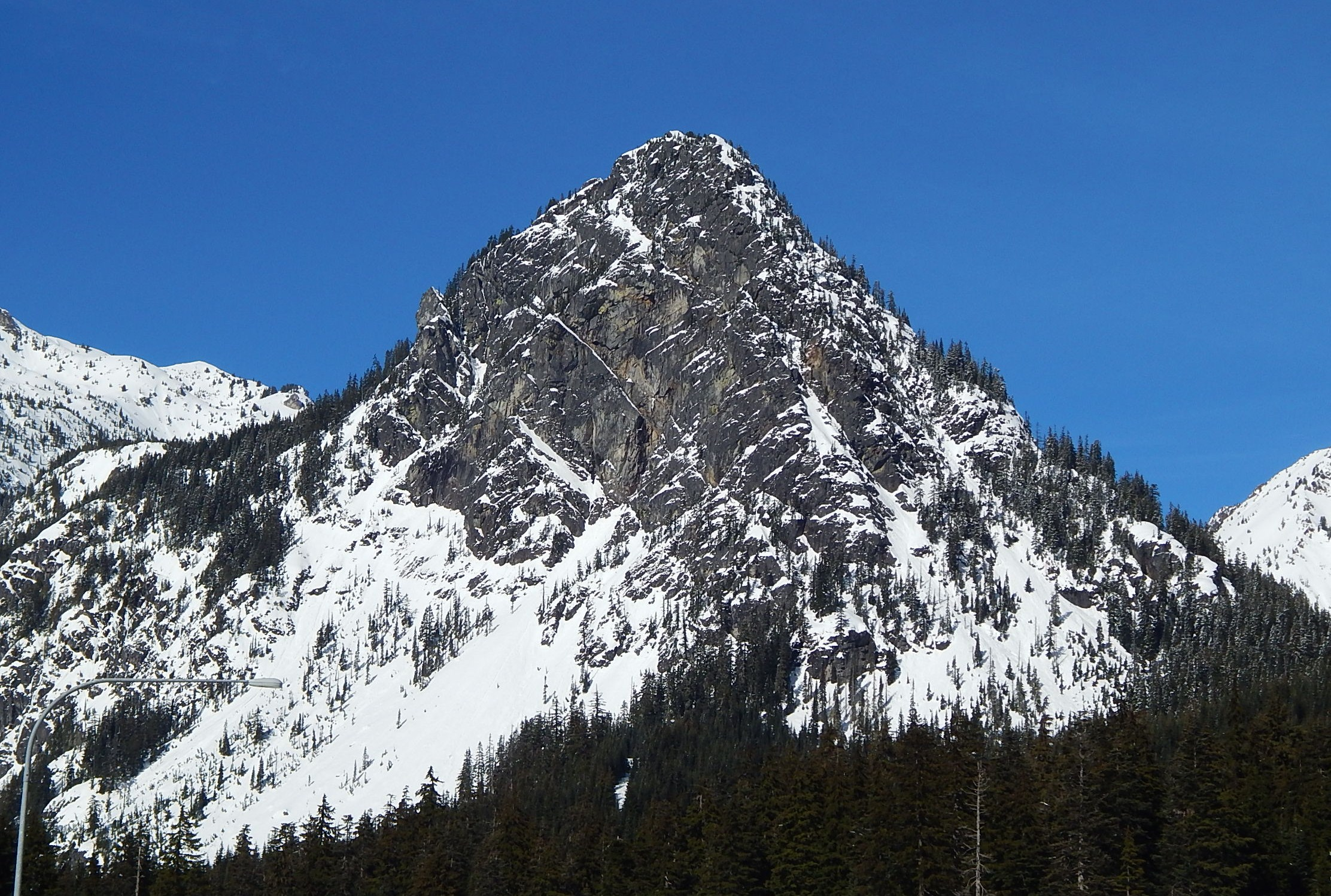
- South aspect from Snoqualmie Pass

Highest point
- Elevation: 5,168 ft (1,575 m) NGVD 29
- Prominence: 528 ft (161 m)
- Parent peak: Kendall Peak (5,784 ft)
- Isolation: 1.12 mi (1.80 km)
- Coordinates: 47°26′29″N 121°24′33″W

Geography
- Location within Washington (state) Location within the United States
- Location: King County, Washington, U.S.
- Parent range: Cascade Range
- Topo map: USGS Snoqualmie Pass

Climbing
- Easiest route: Exposed Scramble, class 3

Guye Peak is a mountain in the northwest United States in the Cascade Range of Washington, east of Seattle. Named for Francis M. Guye, who held an iron mining claim on it in the 1880s, it lies in the Alpine Lakes Wilderness area and overlooks Snoqualmie Pass from the north.

Guye Peak was first climbed on October 6, 1912, by Charles Hazlehurst, Hector Abel, Paul Dubuar, and Mary Hard. The climb is 2,000 feet (600 m) from the pass valley and has mixed rock climbing and scrambling, ranging from class 3 to class 5.6. It is popular partly because of easy access from Interstate 90.

Like other hiking experiences in the region, Guye Peak has wet-climate hazards such as mossy or otherwise slippery rocks in the summer and avalanches in the winter. At least eight climbers have died in falls on Guye Peak, including the mathematician Oded Schramm in 2008.

== Geology ==
The Alpine Lakes Wilderness features some of the most rugged topography in the Cascade Range with craggy peaks and ridges, deep glacial valleys, and granite walls spotted with over 700 mountain lakes. Geological events occurring many years ago created the diverse topography and drastic elevation changes over the Cascade Range leading to the various climate differences.

The history of the formation of the Cascade Mountains dates back millions of years ago to the late Eocene Epoch. With the North American Plate overriding the Pacific Plate, episodes of volcanic igneous activity persisted. In addition, small fragments of the oceanic and continental lithosphere called terranes created the North Cascades about 50 million years ago.

During the Pleistocene period dating back over two million years ago, glaciation advancing and retreating repeatedly scoured and shaped the landscape. The last glacial retreat in the Alpine Lakes area began about 14,000 years ago and was north of the Canada–US border by 10,000 years ago. The U-shaped cross section of the river valleys is a result of that recent glaciation. Uplift and faulting in combination with glaciation have been the dominant processes which have created the tall peaks and deep valleys of the Alpine Lakes Wilderness area.

== Climate ==
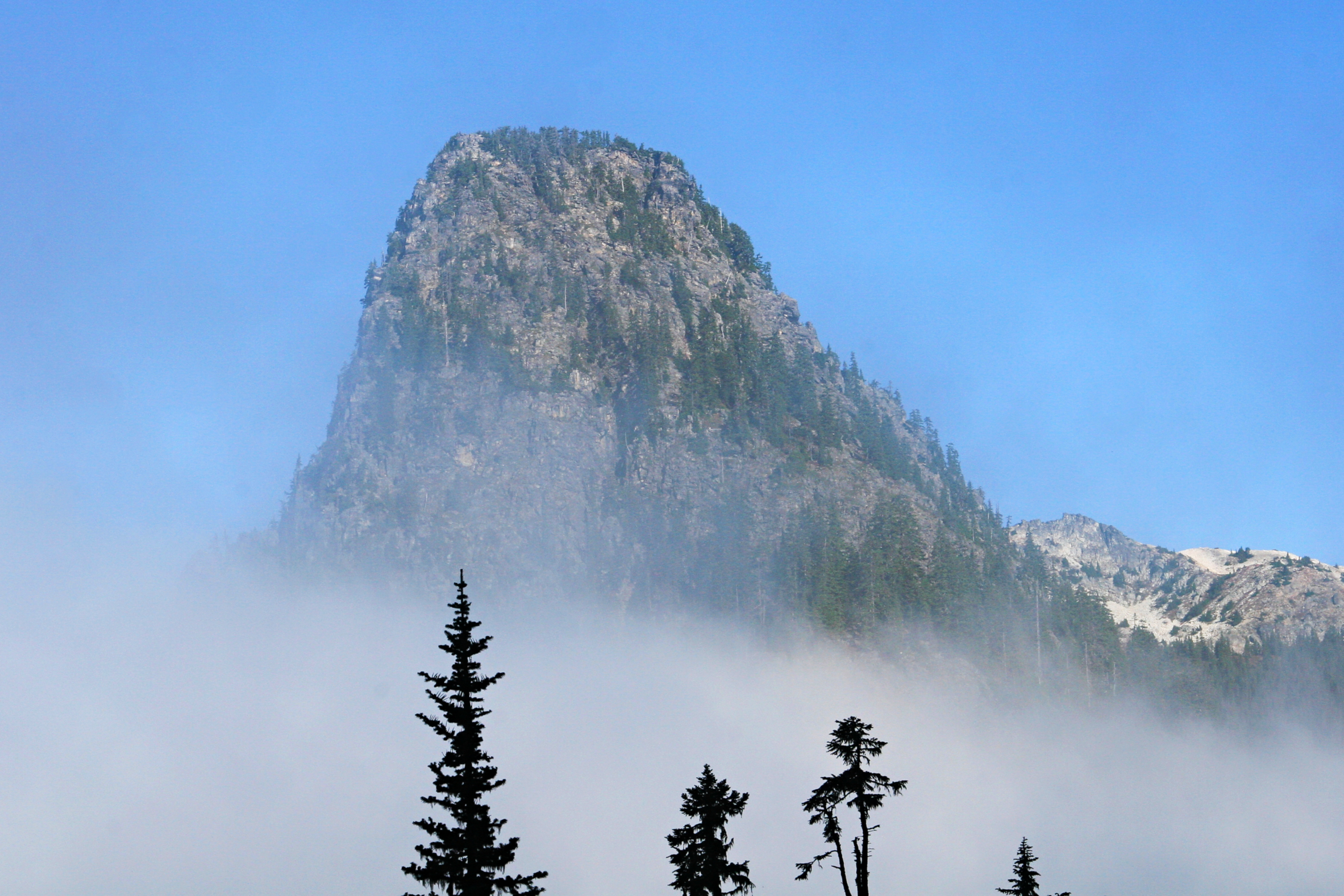
Guye Peak emerging through fog

Guye Peak is located in the marine west coast climate zone of western North America. Most weather fronts originate in the Pacific Ocean, and travel northeast toward the Cascade Mountains. As fronts approach, they are forced upward by the peaks of the Cascade Range (Orographic lift), causing them to drop their moisture in the form of rain or snowfall onto the Cascades. As a result, the west side of the North Cascades experiences high precipitation, especially during the winter months in the form of snowfall.

Due to its temperate climate and proximity to the Pacific Ocean, areas west of the Cascade Crest very rarely experience temperatures below 0 °F (−18 °C) or above 80 °F (27 °C). During winter months, weather is usually cloudy, but, due to high pressure systems over the Pacific Ocean that intensify during summer months, there is often little or no cloud cover during the summer. Because of maritime influence, snow tends to be wet and heavy, resulting in high avalanche danger. The months July through September offer the most favorable weather for viewing or climbing this peak.

== See also ==
- List of peaks of the Alpine Lakes Wilderness

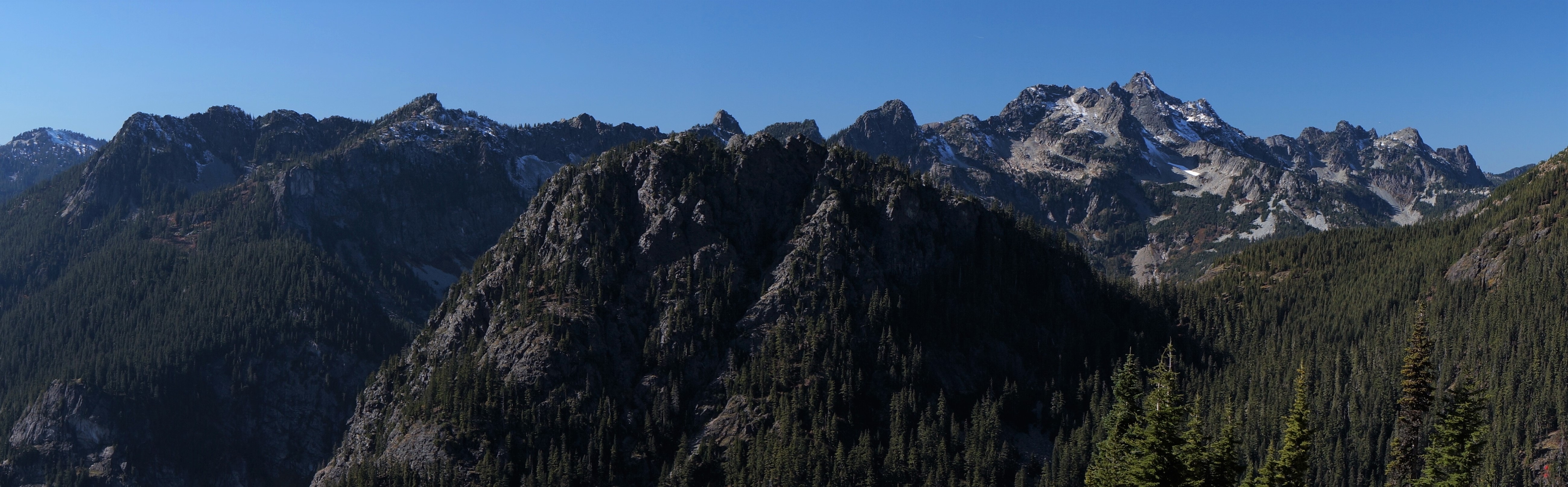
Guye Peak front and center, from Kendall Peak. Left to right in back are Denny Mountain, The Tooth, Bryant Peak, Chair Peak, and Mount Roosevelt

.
