= The Tooth (Washington) =

Peak in the Cascade Range

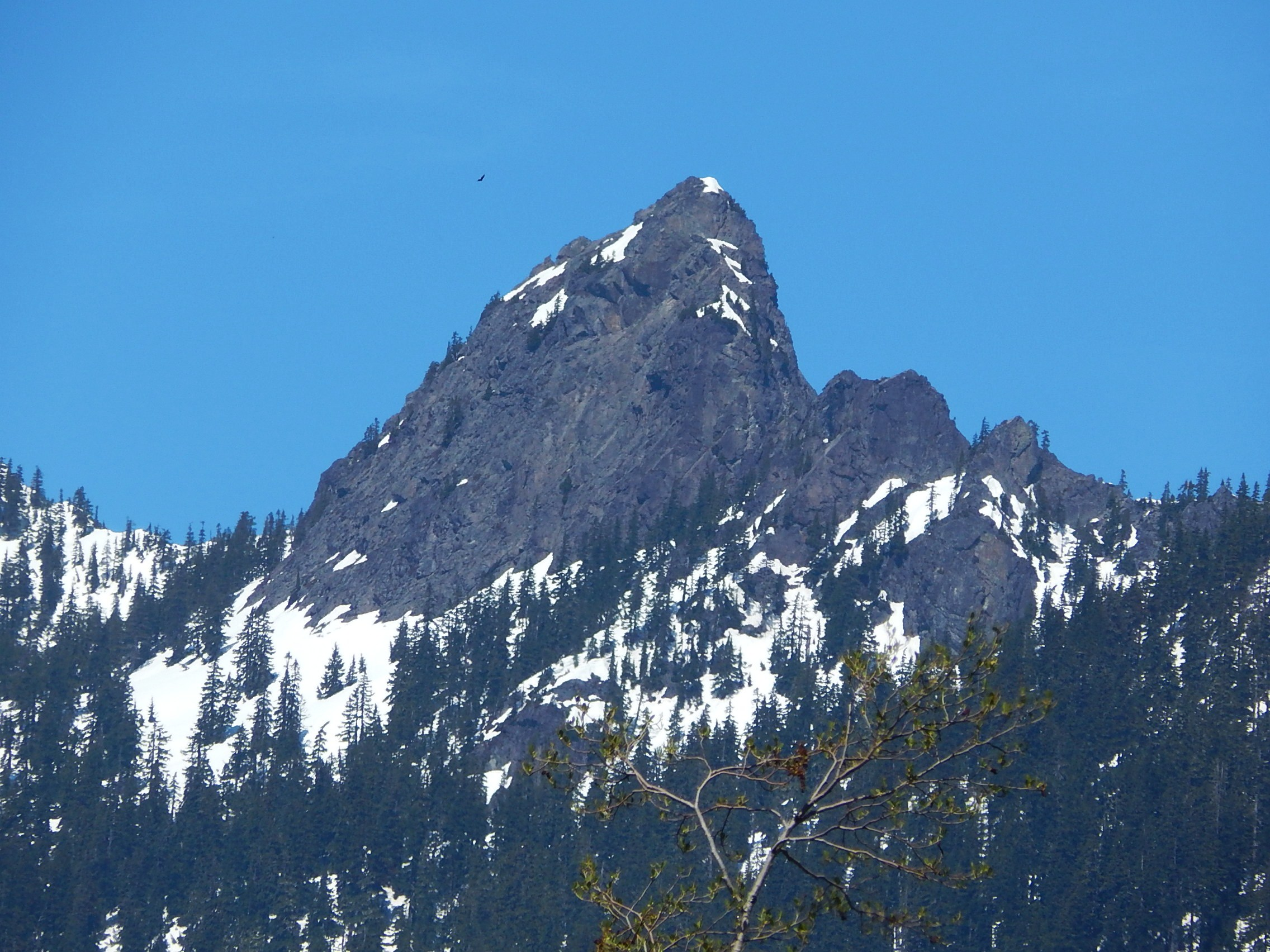
- The Tooth seen from eastbound Interstate 90

Highest point
- Elevation: 5,606 ft (1,709 m)
- Prominence: 293 ft (89 m)
- Parent peak: Bryant Peak
- Coordinates: 47°26′45″N 121°27′17″W

Geography
- Location within Washington (state) Location within the United States
- Country: United States
- State: Washington
- County: King
- Protected area: Alpine Lakes Wilderness
- Parent range: Cascade Range
- Topo map: USGS Snoqualmie Pass

Geology
- Rock type: Andesite

Climbing
- First ascent: 1928
- Easiest route: Scrambling class 4

The Tooth is the descriptive name for a 5,606-foot-elevation (1,709-meter) fin-like, andesite pillar located in King County of Washington state. It is part of the Cascade Range and is within the Alpine Lakes Wilderness. The Tooth is located northwest of Snoqualmie Pass and the Alpental ski area on land managed by Mount Baker-Snoqualmie National Forest. The nearest higher peak is Bryant Peak, 0.44 miles (0.71 km) to the northwest. Originally called Denny Horn and Denny Tooth, The Tooth became the officially recognized name in 1918, with Denny referring to its position on the high ridge between Denny Mountain and Chair Peak. The Tooth is a popular rock-climbing destination, even in winter. The easiest route is class 4 scrambling, but solid rock provides technical routes, with the South Face considered a classic 5.4 climb that was first done in 1928 by Lloyd Anderson and Herman Wunderling. In 2023, a woman died while descending unroped from the summit.

== Climate ==
The Tooth is located in the marine west coast climate zone of western North America. Weather fronts originating in the Pacific Ocean travel east toward the Cascade Mountains. As fronts approach, they are forced upward by the peaks of the Cascade Range, causing them to drop their moisture in the form of rain or snowfall onto the Cascades (Orographic lift). As a result, the west side of the Cascades experiences high precipitation, especially during the winter months in the form of snowfall. Because of maritime influence, snow tends to be wet and heavy, resulting in high avalanche danger. During winter months, weather is usually cloudy, but due to high pressure systems over the Pacific Ocean that intensify during summer months, there is often little or no cloud cover during the summer. Precipitation runoff from The Tooth drains into tributaries of the Snoqualmie River.

== Geology ==
The Alpine Lakes Wilderness features some of the most rugged topography in the Cascade Range with craggy peaks and ridges, deep glacial valleys, and granite walls spotted with over 700 mountain lakes. Geological events occurring many years ago created the diverse topography and drastic elevation changes over the Cascade Range leading to the various climate differences.

The history of the formation of the Cascade Mountains dates back millions of years ago to the late Eocene Epoch. With the North American Plate overriding the Pacific Plate, episodes of volcanic igneous activity persisted. In addition, small fragments of the oceanic and continental lithosphere called terranes created the North Cascades about 50 million years ago.

During the Pleistocene period dating back over two million years ago, glaciation advancing and retreating repeatedly scoured the landscape leaving deposits of rock debris. The last glacial retreat in the Alpine Lakes area began about 14,000 years ago and was north of the Canada–US border by 10,000 years ago. The U-shaped cross section of the river valleys is a result of that recent glaciation. Uplift and faulting in combination with glaciation have been the dominant processes which have created the tall peaks and deep valleys of the Alpine Lakes Wilderness area.

== Gallery ==
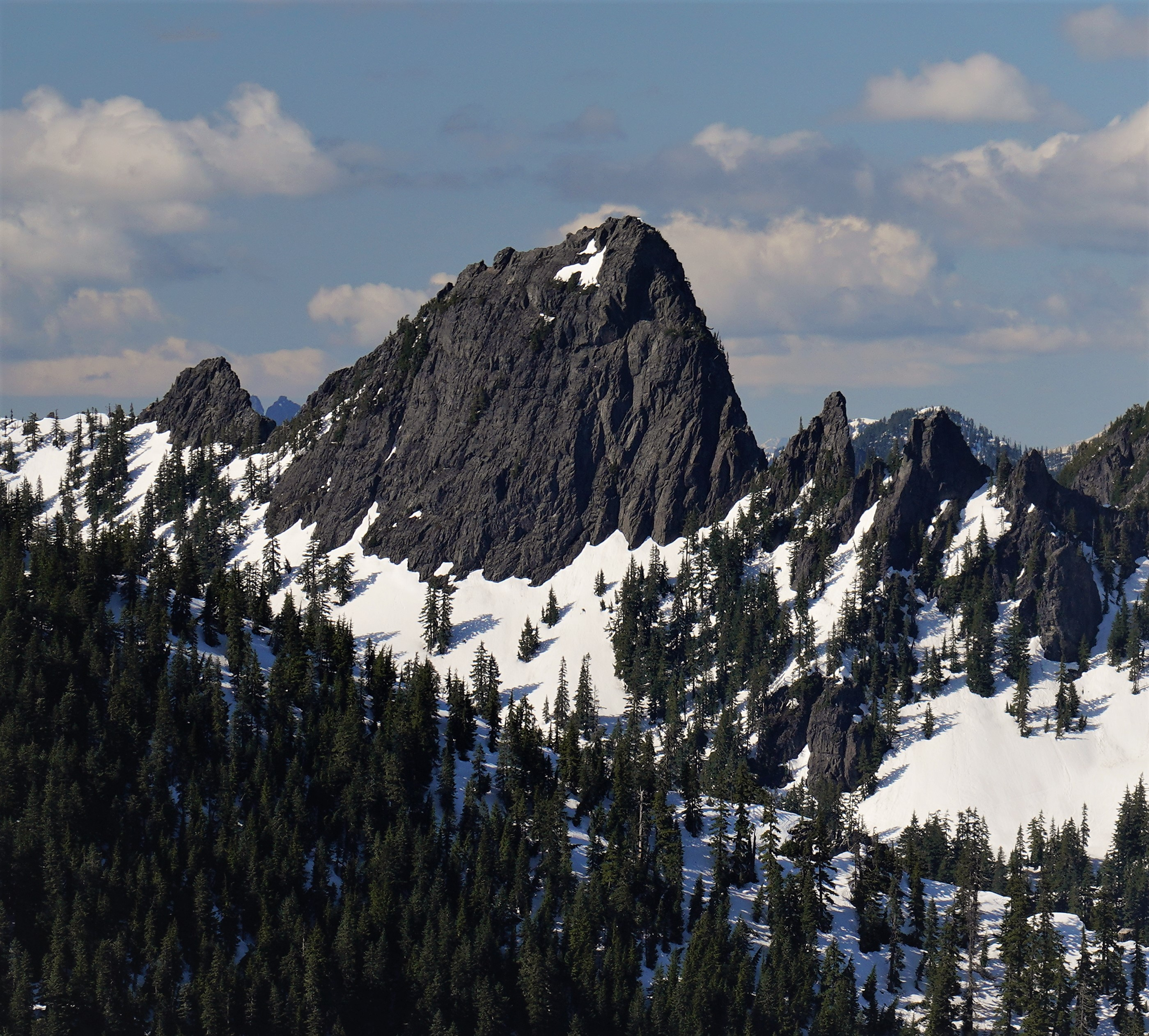
South aspect from Granite Mountain

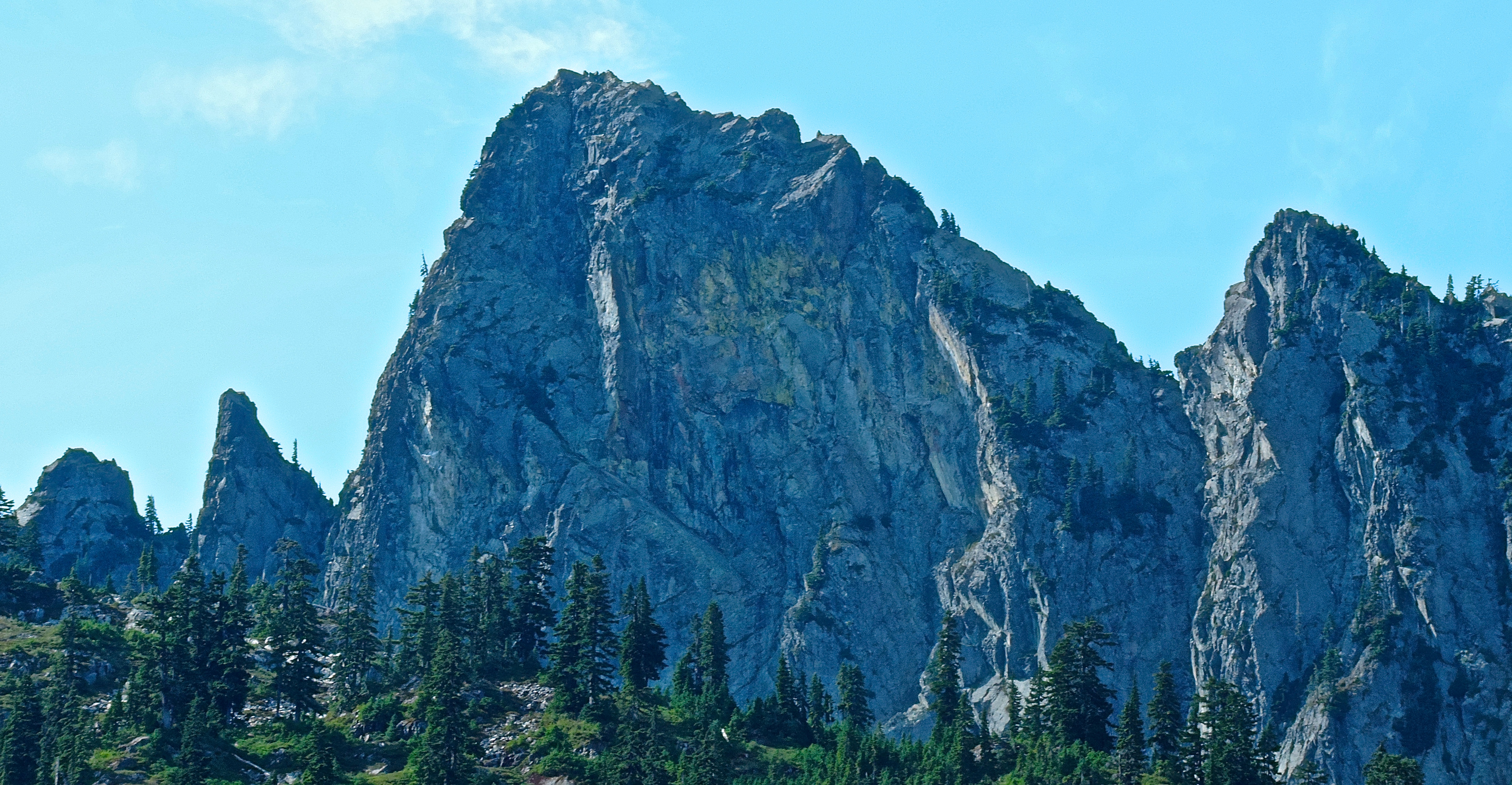
The Tooth, north aspect

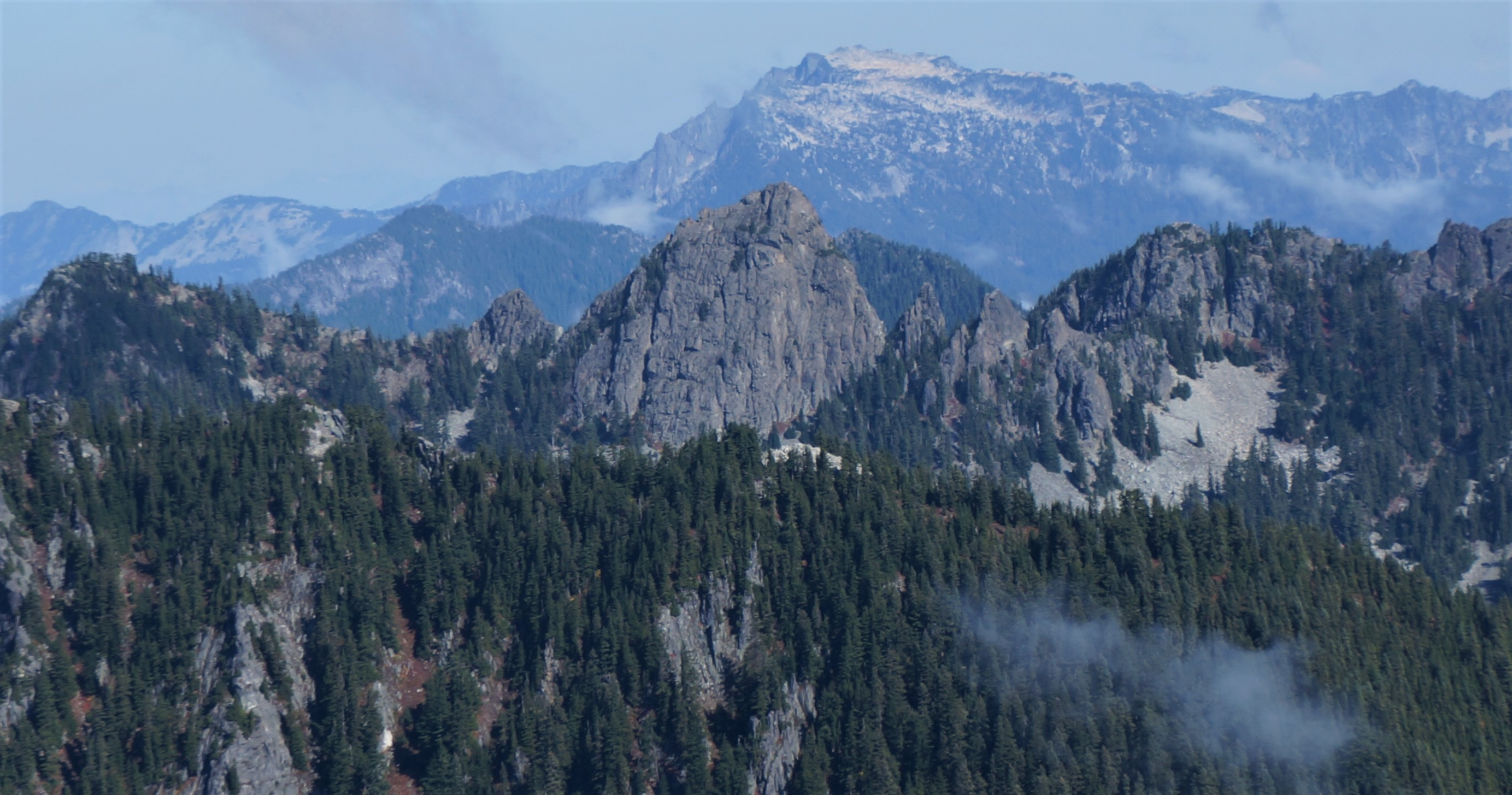
The Tooth and Big Snow Mountain

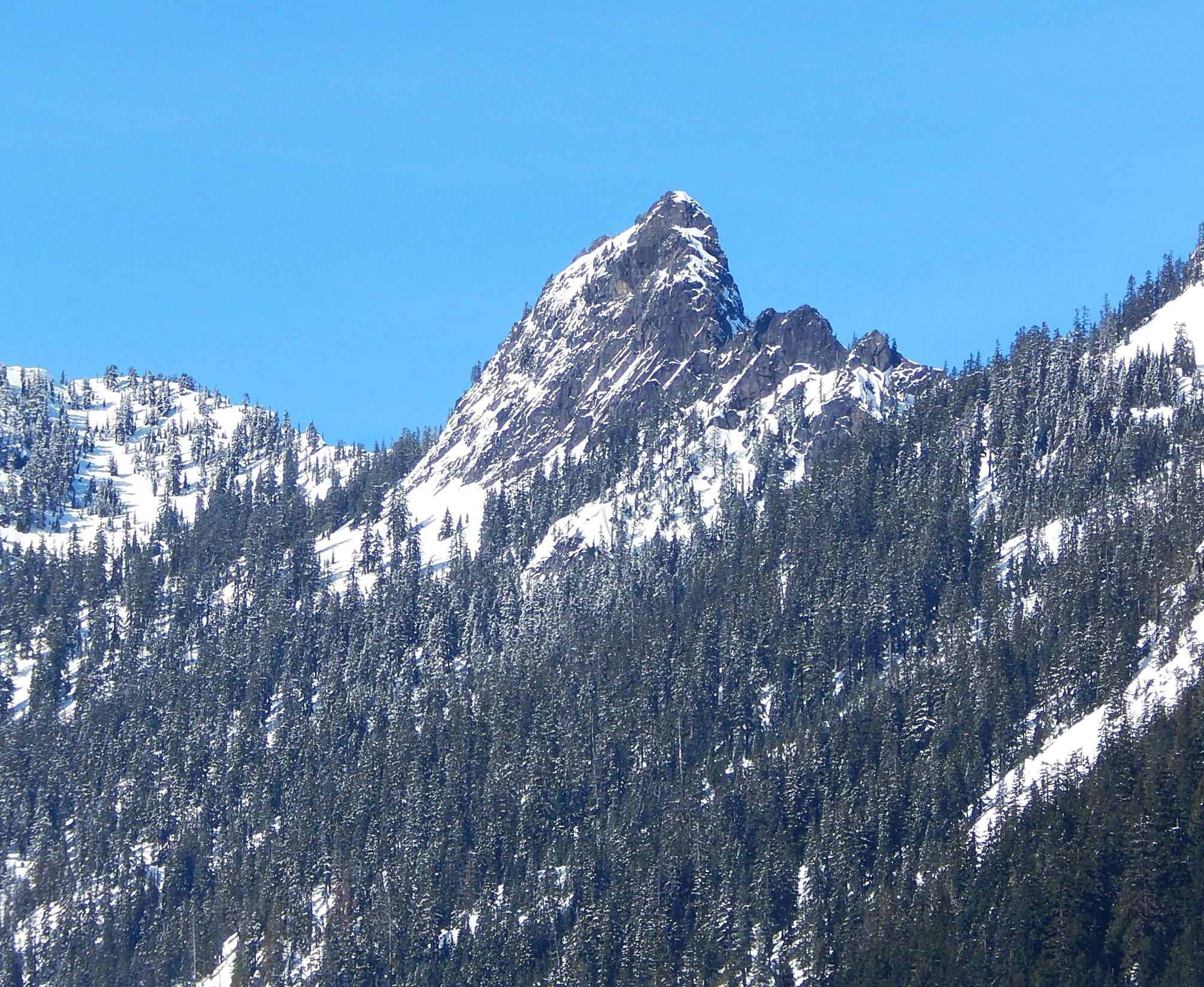

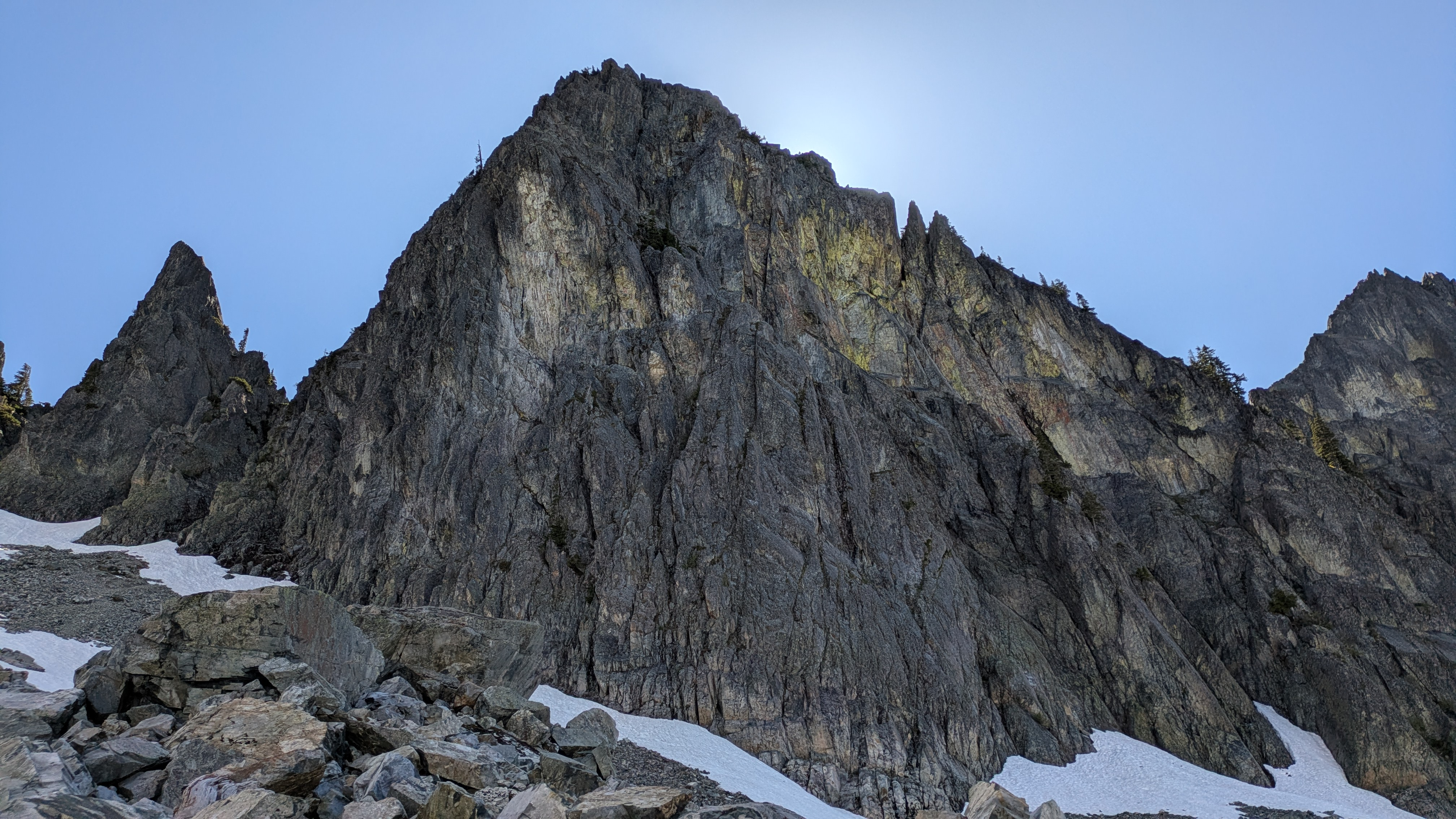

== See also ==
- List of peaks of the Alpine Lakes Wilderness
