= Alexis Waite =

American snowboarder

Alexis Waite (born October 30, 1981) is an American professional snowboarder. She learned to snowboard when she was 12 years old near her hometown of Seattle. Currently residing in Albuquerque, New Mexico teaching yoga Hotel Chaco and leading retreats La Vida Retreats and making custom jewelry Feral Stone.

== Career ==
Growing up in the Pacific Northwest of the United States, Alexis Waite learned to snowboard at local Seattle ski areas Alpental and Stevens Pass. She decided she wanted to be a professional snowboarder when she was a teenager, and began pursuing a career through the contest circuit in New England at 17, where she attended Stratton Mountain School.

Waite first gained recognition in snowboarding the following year in 2000, when she won the USSA Eastern Halfpipe Championship and also the USASA National Freestyle Championship and became both 2000 Regional and National Champion as a high school senior. During the 2002/2003 season she became a professional snowboarder and continued to compete, switching her freestyle focus to Slopestyle, Quarterpipe and Rails. Early wins were the 2003 Vans Triple Crown Jib Contest and the 2003 Summer Windell's Bonfire Triple Rail Jam. No stranger to the podium since then, Waite is usually in the finals of the major contests, and has been a Winter X-Games SlopeStyle regular since 2004. She also won "Best Trick" and a Rolex at the 2006 Abominable Snow Jam Quarterpipe @ Mt Hood, and "Best Trick" at the US Open Rail Jam in 2005.

She is considered more influential in the snowboard video industry, than the competitive realm, as competition was never her primary focus. Her first video appearance was in "Declaration" (2002). Since then, she has been appearing in videos including "Neoproto" (2003), "As If" (2005) and "Ro Sham Bo" (2006) by Misschief films, "LaLaLand" (2007) by Runway Films and "Labor of Love" (2007) by Roxy, and had a cameo and stunt double appearance in "White Air" (2007). Waite has been the subject on several television shows, including "First Hand" (2006) on FuelTV and "Stunt Junkies" (2007) on Discovery Channel.

Early on in her career, Waite helped design the Santa Cruz Snowboards women's line when she was a member of their team, including the acclaimed "Muse" snowboard. Best known as a long-time Roxy Snow Team rider, Alexis' signature pro-model snowboard is the Roxy "Ollie Pop" which has been an award-winning top seller for her primary sponsor, Roxy. She also has a signature pro-model snowboard boot for sponsor Northwave/Drake boots and bindings. Electric Eyewear and Boost Mobile round out her sponsor list. Exit Real World in Portland was her shop sponsor. VOGUE magazine featured Alexis Waite as a new style leader in article titled "Tomorrow's Muse" (Oct 04). Luckily her career was not defined by injury, however she notably broke her eye socket, cheekbone and wrist in the 2005 Winter X-Games, and both her hands simultaneously at Ms SuperPark 2007.

Waite retired from pro-snowboarding in 2010 and returned to Seattle. In 2011, she moved to Whitefish, Montana for 5 years. Here she learned energy healing, reflexology and helped manage a 6,500 acre cattle ranch by horseback in the Bear Paw Mountains. As she has been practicing yoga since 1995, she started teaching in 2014. She trained under Yogi Aaron Starr at Blue Osa in Costa Rica and got her teaching career started at the Yoga Hive in Whitefish, Montana.

Alexis currently resides in Albuquerque, New Mexico where she teaches yoga at Hotel Chaco.
