= Alpental =

Valley and part of a ski area in Washington, United States

Coordinates: 47°26′35″N 121°25′46″W

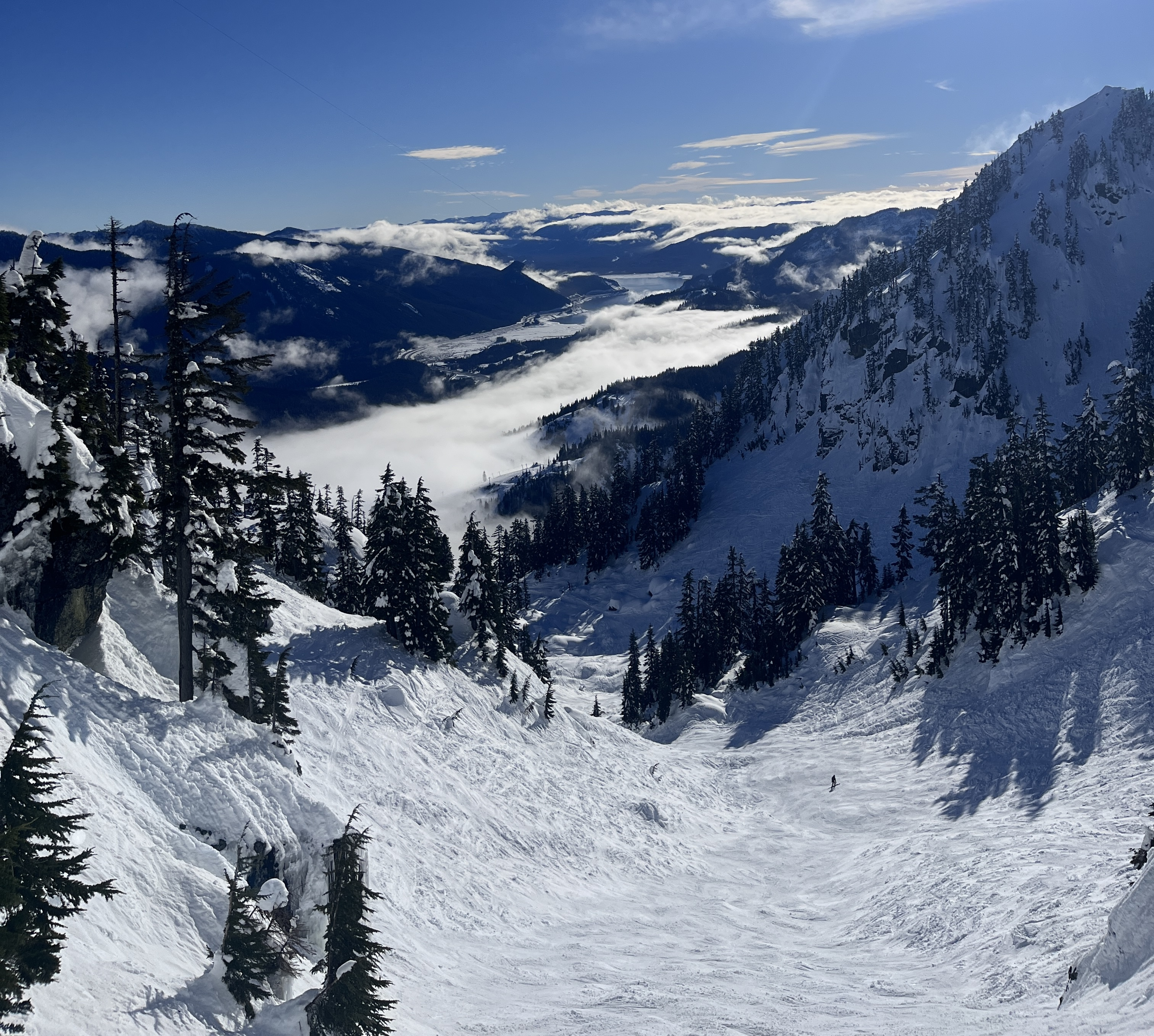
View from the top of Alpental, January 2025

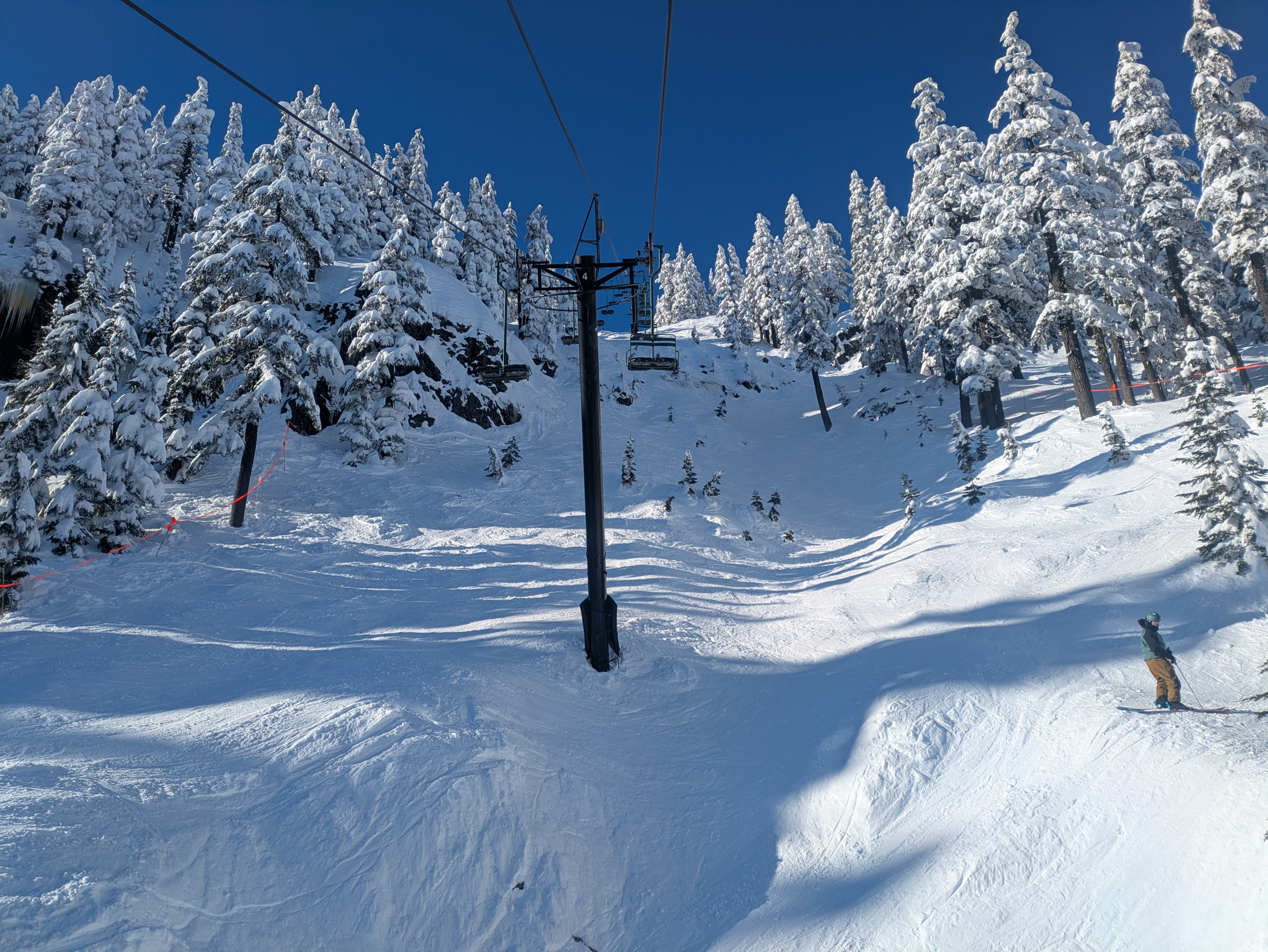
A double black run viewed from the upper chairlift

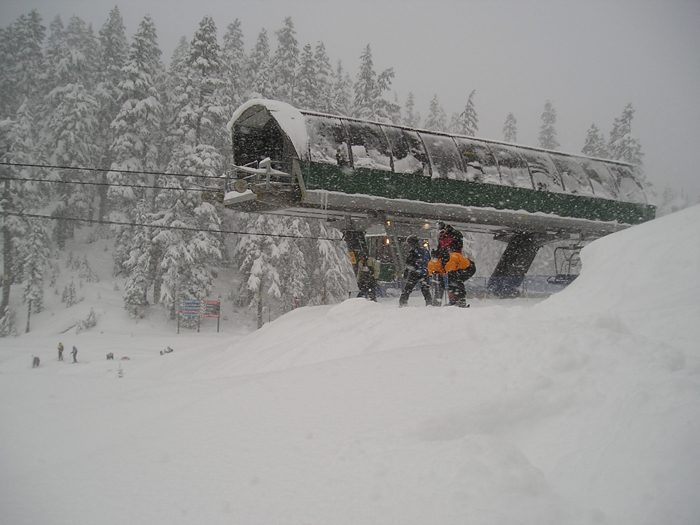
Top of Armstrong Express (also known as Chair 1)

Alpental, named after the German word for alpine valley, is both a valley in eastern King County, Washington, United States, and part of a ski area in the valley. The valley is about 50 miles (80 km) east of Seattle, Washington and is north of Snoqualmie Pass, in the Washington Cascades. It is a popular outdoor recreation destination in summer and winter. The ski area is one of four areas that make up The Summit at Snoqualmie.

== Topography ==
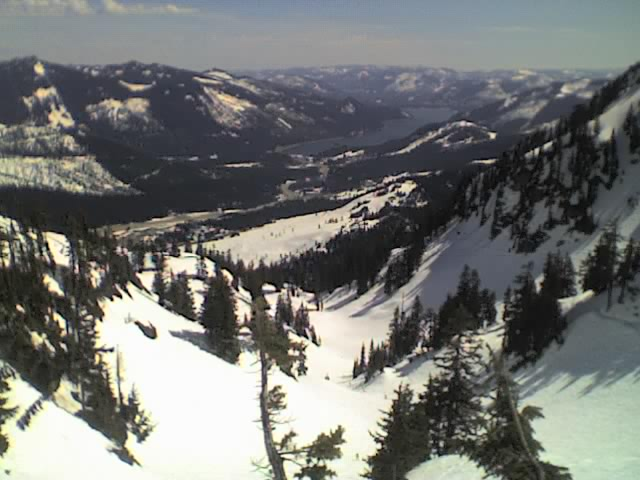
View from the top of Edelweiss Chair (also known as Chair 2)

The valley runs north to northwest from Snoqualmie Pass for about 3 miles (5 km). Geologically, it is a three-sided canyon. Along the west side of the valley a ridge runs between Denny Mountain, The Tooth, Bryant Peak, and Chair Peak. Source Lake occupies the upper valley area on the north side of the valley. This lake is the source of the South Fork of the Snoqualmie River, which meets the other forks of the Snoqualmie River before Snoqualmie Falls near North Bend, Washington. On the east side of the valley lies Guye Peak, Cave Ridge, and Snoqualmie Mountain.

The valley is about 50 miles (80 km) east of Seattle, Washington. The Alpental Road (Forest Service Road No. 9040) begins at I-90 Exit 52 at Snoqualmie Pass and runs into the valley. The Alpental Road may also be reached by taking the Denny Creek Road (Forest Service Road No. 58) in the summer months.

== Recreation ==
Alpental Valley is a popular outdoor recreation area in the Cascades during summer and winter.

In the summer, Alpental Valley provides a starting point for hikers and climbers. The hiking trails provide access to the Alpine Lakes Wilderness; there is a rich climbing history starting from the Alpental Valley floor.

During winter, people downhill ski and snowboard at the challenging but historically relaxed Alpental Ski Area (part of The Summit at Snoqualmie ski resort). Recent additions by Booth Creek Holdings have added gas fire pits, heated sidewalks, and other comforts. While most of the mountain is skiable by intermediate and advanced skiers, the cliff areas are among the roughest skiing terrain in the state, and should only be attempted by very experienced skiers. The expert-run International is well known among Puget Sound area skiers and snowboarders, and has been nicknamed "Nash." Four chair lifts and a magic carpet on the west side of the valley beneath Denny Mountain serve the ski area. People backcountry ski, snowshoe and ice climb in Alpental Valley using the upper parking lots, traditionally known as lots 3 and 4, as a starting point.

Olympic gold medalist Debbie Armstrong developed her skills at Alpental while growing up in Seattle. The run "Debbie's Gold" and the "Armstrong Express" chairlift are named for her.

Avalanches are a risk in the Alpental Valley; several people have died in the valley as a result of avalanches. As of the 2024-25 season there are five lifts and one conveyer. The lifts include one high-speed quad, one double, and three new triples.

== Ownership and development ==
Alpental valley in the summer, viewed from Guye Peak

The land in the valley is in a mixture of public and private ownership. Most of the upper slopes of the valley are publicly owned under the management of the United States Forest Service (USFS). The Summit at Snoqualmie (including Alpental) is owned by CNL Income Properties with a long-term lease to Boyne USA Resorts. The ski runs of the Alpental Ski Area are on USFS Mount Baker-Snoqualmie National Forest land and are operated under a Special Use Permit (SUP)

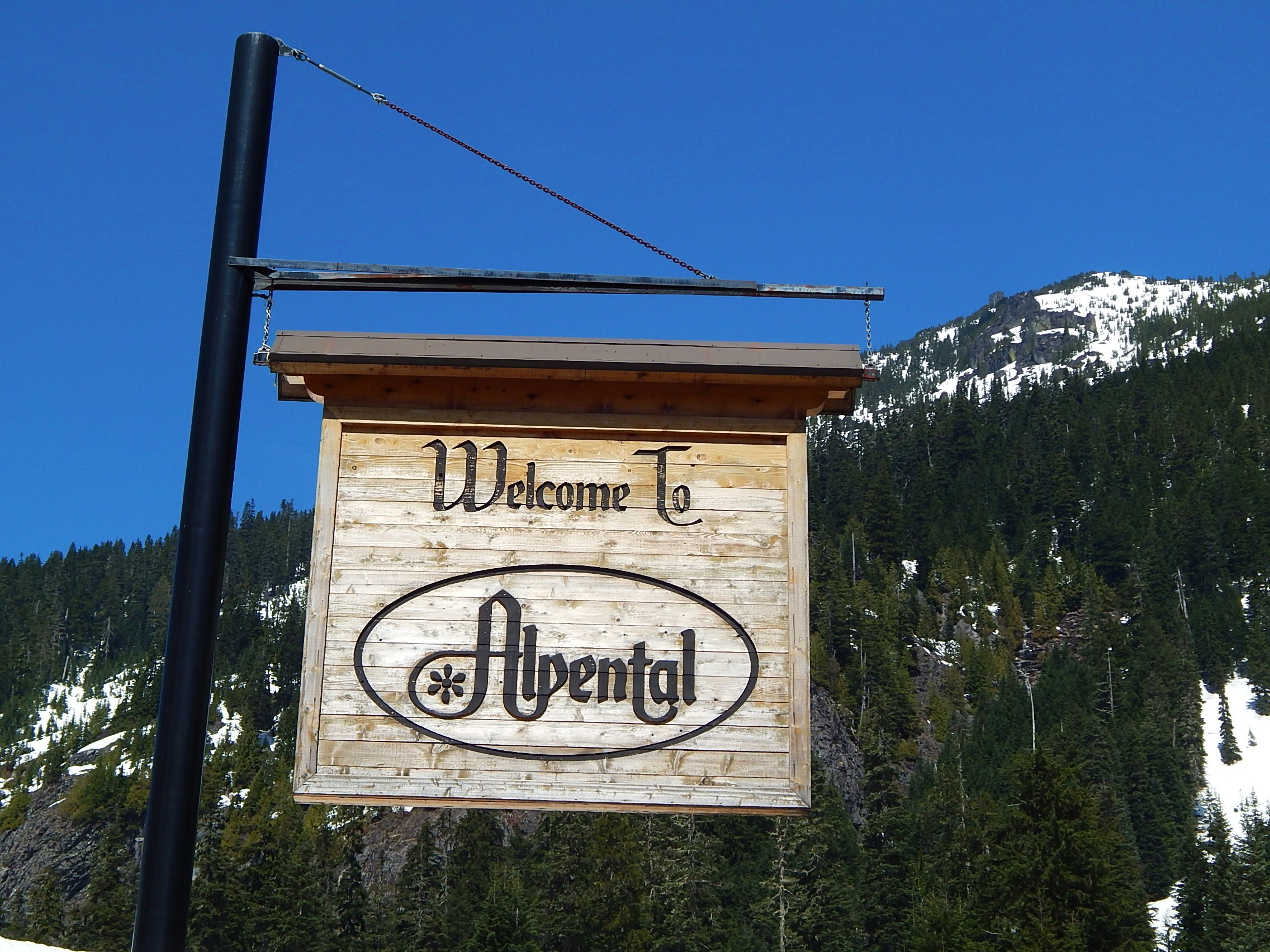
Alpental sign

Additional smaller private development includes two condo complexes in the upper valley, a small number of private homes in one Bavarian themed subdivision in the mid-valley that began in 1968. In the lower valley are two lodges of outdoor clubs: The Washington Alpine Club on the west and the Sahalie Ski Club on the east which operates two private rope tows above its lodge. These lodges have been cited as significant sources of particulate air pollution in the valley. In 1995, the Sahalie Ski Club clear-cut logged seven acres of land resulted in litigation with the mid-valley homeowners over resulting avalanche issues. In 1998 the new Armstrong Express detachable lift was installed.

In 2022, Boyne Resorts announced the Alpental Aspect, and in 2023 a timeline was established. To the frustration of many skiers, Alpental closed early and its slopes were torn down in late April 2023, marking the beginning of the execution of the Alpental Aspect plan.
