= Denny Mountain =

Mountain in Washington (state), United States

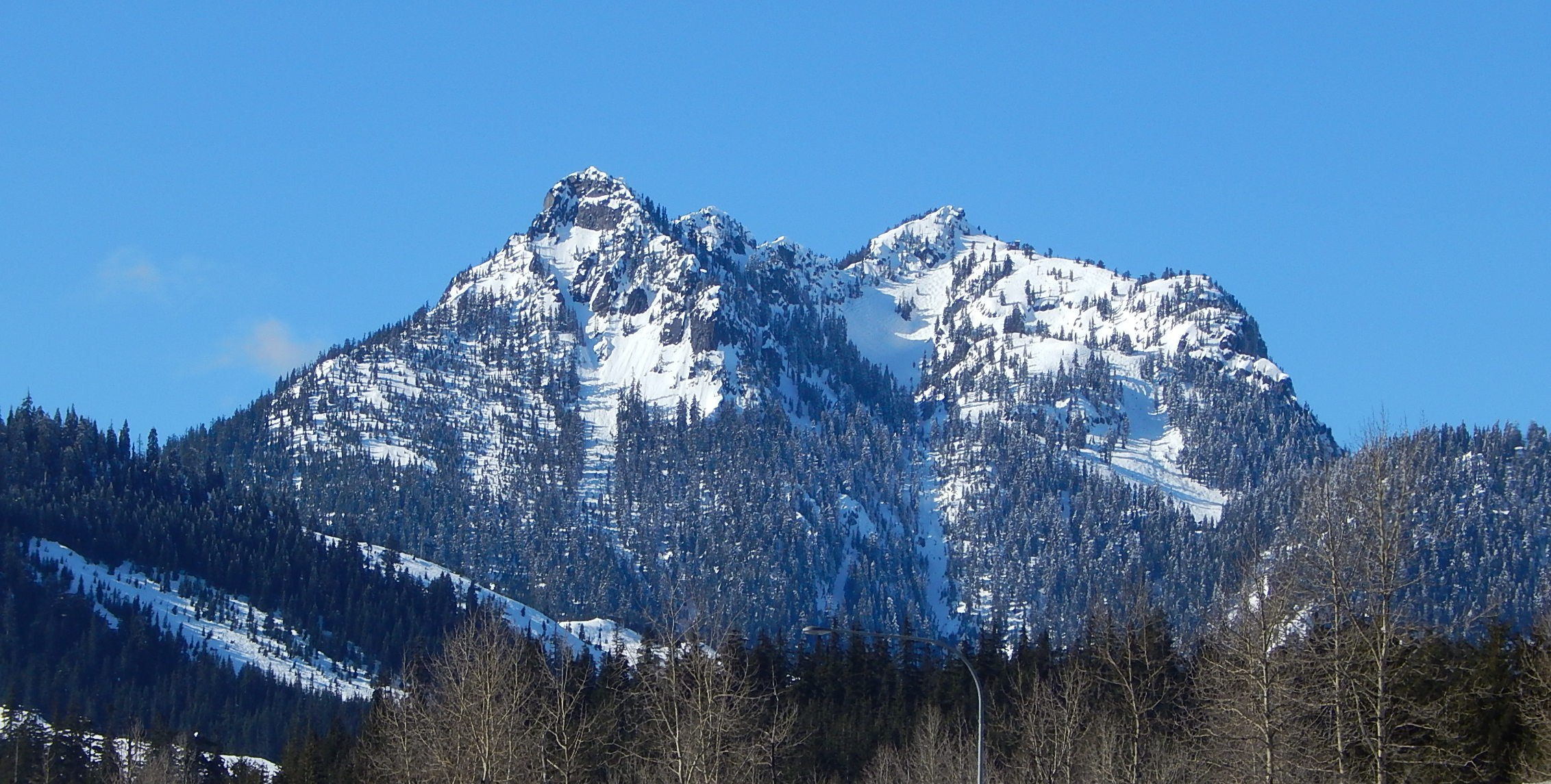
- Denny Mountain from Snoqualmie Pass area

Highest point
- Elevation: 5520+ ft (1682+ m) NGVD 29
- Prominence: 240 ft (73 m)
- Coordinates: 47°26′19″N 121°26′39″W

Geography
- Location within Washington (state) Location within the United States
- Location: King County, Washington, U.S.
- Parent range: Cascades
- Topo map: USGS Snoqualmie Pass

Denny Mountain is summit near Snoqualmie Pass in Washington state. The Alpental ski area is located on the mountain's eastern flank.

The mountain is named after Arthur A. Denny of the Denny Party, who oversaw the construction of the Snoqualmie Pass Road, which later became I-90, and which runs along the mountain's southern base.

== Climate ==
Denny Mountain is located in the marine west coast climate zone of western North America. Most weather fronts originate in the Pacific Ocean, and travel northeast toward the Cascade Mountains. As fronts approach, they are forced upward by the peaks of the Cascade Range, causing them to drop their moisture in the form of rain or snowfall onto the Cascades (Orographic lift). As a result, the west side of the Cascades experiences high precipitation, especially during the winter months in the form of snowfall. During winter months, weather is usually cloudy, but, due to high pressure systems over the Pacific Ocean that intensify during summer months, there is often little or no cloud cover during the summer. Because of maritime influence, snow tends to be wet and heavy, resulting in high avalanche danger.
