= Bryant Peak =

Mountain in Washington (state), United States

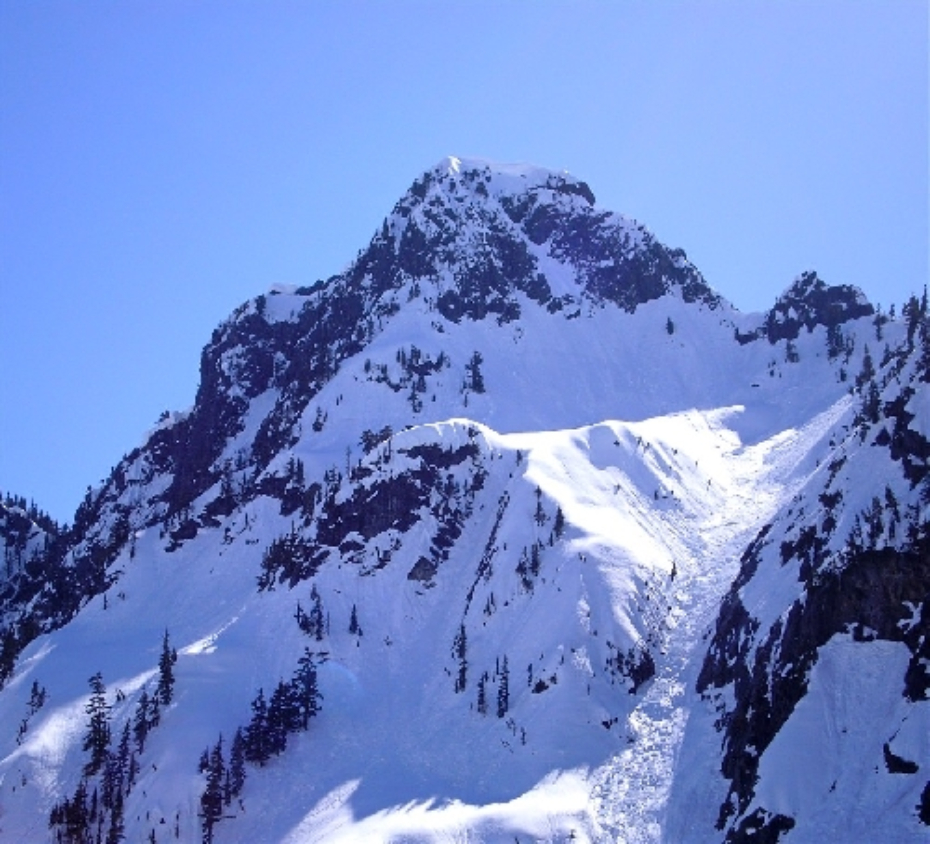
- Bryant Peak, east aspect

Highest point
- Elevation: 5,801 ft (1,768 m)
- Prominence: 321 ft (98 m)
- Parent peak: Chair Peak (6,238 ft)
- Isolation: 0.65 mi (1.05 km)
- Coordinates: 47°27′05″N 121°27′39″W

Geography
- Location within Washington (state) Location within the United States
- Country: United States
- State: Washington
- County: King
- Protected area: Alpine Lakes Wilderness
- Parent range: Cascade Range
- Topo map: USGS Snoqualmie Pass

Geology
- Rock type: Andesite

Climbing
- First ascent: 1926 by Anderson, Best, Maxwell, Shorrock, West, Wunderling
- Easiest route: Scrambling

Bryant Peak is a 5,801-foot (1,768-metre) summit located in King County of Washington state. It's part of the Cascade Range and is within the Alpine Lakes Wilderness. Bryant Peak is located northwest of Snoqualmie Pass and the Alpental ski area, on land managed by Mount Baker-Snoqualmie National Forest. Bryant Peak is located south of Snow Lake which is a popular hiking destination. The nearest higher neighbor is Chair Peak, 0.65 miles (1.05 km) to the northwest. Originally called Hemlock Peak, Bryant Peak was renamed in 1925 to honor Sidney V. Bryant of The Mountaineers who made the first ascent of Kaleetan Peak in 1914. Precipitation runoff from the mountain drains into tributaries of the Snoqualmie River.

== Climate ==
Bryant Peak is located in the marine west coast climate zone of western North America.

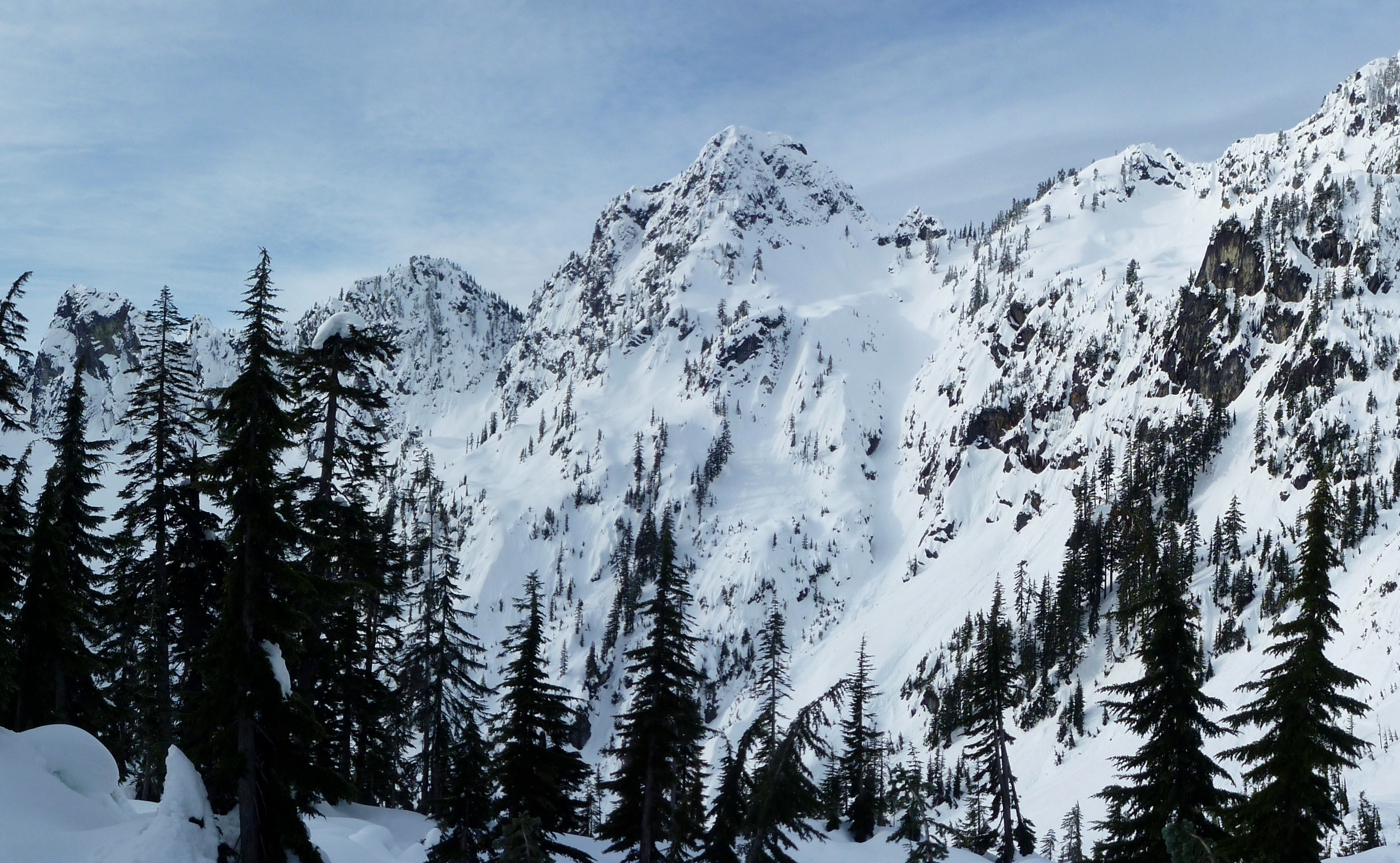
Bryant Peak in winter

Weather fronts originating in the Pacific Ocean travel northeast toward the Cascade Mountains. As fronts approach, they are forced upward by the peaks of the Cascade Range, causing them to drop their moisture in the form of rain or snow onto the Cascades (Orographic lift). As a result, the west side of the Cascades experiences high precipitation, especially during the winter months in the form of snowfall. Because of maritime influence, snow tends to be wet and heavy, resulting in high avalanche danger. During winter months, weather is usually cloudy, but due to high pressure systems over the Pacific Ocean that intensify during summer months, there is often little or no cloud cover during the summer. The months of July through September offer the most favorable weather for viewing or climbing this peak.

== Geology ==
The Alpine Lakes Wilderness features some of the most rugged topography in the Cascade Range with craggy peaks and ridges, deep glacial valleys, and granite walls spotted with over 700 mountain lakes. Geological events occurring many years ago created the diverse topography and drastic elevation changes over the Cascade Range leading to the various climate differences.

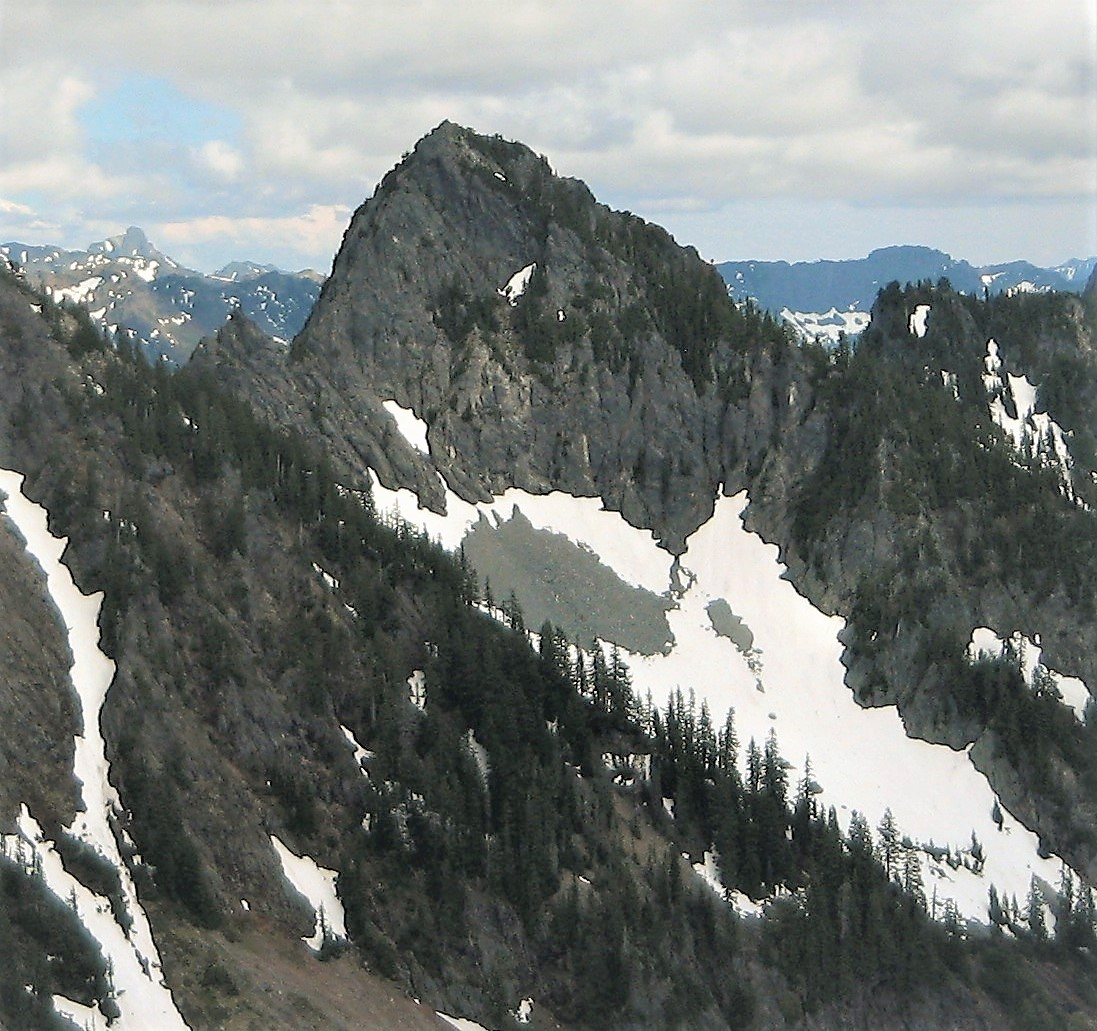
Northwest aspect, from Kaleetan Peak

The history of the formation of the Cascade Mountains dates back millions of years ago to the late Eocene Epoch. With the North American Plate overriding the Pacific Plate, episodes of volcanic igneous activity persisted. In addition, small fragments of the oceanic and continental lithosphere called terranes created the North Cascades about 50 million years ago. During the Pleistocene period dating back over two million years ago, glaciation advancing and retreating repeatedly scoured the landscape leaving deposits of rock debris. The last glacial retreat in the Alpine Lakes area began about 14,000 years ago and was north of the Canada–US border by 10,000 years ago. The U-shaped cross section of the river valleys is a result of that recent glaciation. Uplift and faulting in combination with glaciation have been the dominant processes which have created the tall peaks and deep valleys of the Alpine Lakes Wilderness area.

== See also ==
- List of peaks of the Alpine Lakes Wilderness
