= Marlene Lake =

Lake in Washington state, US

- Location within Washington (state) Location within the United States
- Location: King County, Washington, United States
- Coordinates: 47.56094°N 121.36777°W
- Basin countries: United States
- Surface elevation: 4,029 ft (1,228 m)

Marlene Lake is a small freshwater lake located on a plateau it shares with Moira Lake, a short distance north of Big Snow Mountain, in King County, Washington. The lake can be accessed from the trail that leads past Myrtle Lake, which is West of Marlene Lake. The outflow of Marlene Lake joins the creeks from Moira Lake, Fools Gold Lake and other snow melting creeks to empty as the inflow of Lake Dorothy, which outflows as the East Fork of the Miller River.

== See also ==
- List of lakes of the Alpine Lakes Wilderness
