= Moira Lake (Washington) =

Lake in Washingtion state, U.S.

- Location within Washington (state) Location within the United States
- Location: King County, Washington, United States
- Coordinates: 47.56041°N 121.36509°W
- Basin countries: United States
- Surface area: 1.5 acres (0.0061 km^{2})
- Surface elevation: 3,911 ft (1,192 m)

Moira Lake is a small freshwater lake located on a plateau it shares with Marlene Lake, a short distance north of Big Snow Mountain, in King County, Washington. The lake can be accessed from the trail that leads past Myrtle Lake, which is West of Marlene Lake. The outflow of Moira Lake joins the creeks from Marlene Lake, Fools Gold Lake and other snow melting creeks to empty as the inflow of Lake Dorothy, which outflows as the East Fork of the Miller River. The lake is home to cutthroat trout and rainbow trout.

== See also ==
- List of lakes of the Alpine Lakes Wilderness
