= Marten Lake =

Lake in Washington, United States

- Location within Washington (state) Location within the United States
- Location: King County, Washington, United States
- Coordinates: 47.5927°N 121.5144°W
- Primary outflows: Marten Creek
- Basin countries: United States
- Surface area: 37.7 acres (0.153 km^{2})
- Surface elevation: 2,963 ft (903 m)

Marten Lake is a freshwater lake located on the southern slope of Dog Mountain in King County, Washington, United States. It is west of Anderson Lake, part of the Alpine Lakes Wilderness. Marten Creek exits Marten Lake into a canyon that produces a tributary to the Taylor River. Because of its proximity to Dog Mountain summit and the cirque of Rooster Mountain to the west, the lake is a popular area for hiking, swimming, and fishing cutthroat trout and rainbow trout. Access to Marten Lake is provided through an unmaintained access trail that splits off the Snoqualmie Lake Trail.

A short distance east of Lake Marten is a short side trail that branches off Taylor River Trail, shortly after the crossing of Otter Creek, that leads to Otter Falls, a snow-driven waterfall which drops directly into Lipsy Lake. Dream Lake is further east past Otter Falls.

== See also ==
- List of lakes of the Alpine Lakes Wilderness
