= Fools Gold Lake =

Lake in Washington state, US

- Location within Washington (state) Location within the United States
- Location: King County, Washington, United States
- Coordinates: 47.549659°N 121.366225°W
- Basin countries: United States
- Surface elevation: 4,672 ft (1,424 m)

Fools Gold Lake are a set of two small freshwater lakes located on a plateau a short distance north of Big Snow Mountain, in King County, Washington. The lake can be accessed from the trail that leads to Myrtle Lake, which is West of Fools Gold Lake. Big Snow Lake is over the southern slope of the lake plateau towards Big Snow Mountain. The outflow of Fools Gold Lake joins the creeks from Marlene Lake, Moira Lake and other snow melting creeks to empty as the inflow of Lake Dorothy, which outflows as the East Fork of the Miller River.

== See also ==
- List of lakes of the Alpine Lakes Wilderness
