= Anderson Lake (Alpine Lakes Wilderness) =

Lake in King County, Washington, United States

- Location within Washington (state) Location within the United States
- Location: King County, Washington, United States
- Coordinates: 47.6017°N 121.4840°W
- Primary outflows: Unnamed
- Basin countries: United States
- Surface area: 2.1 acres (0.0085 km^{2})
- Surface elevation: 4,190 ft (1,280 m)

Anderson Lake is a small freshwater lake located on the southern slope of Dog Mountain between Marten Lake and Dream Lake, part of the Alpine Lakes Wilderness in King County, Washington. Anderson Creek exits Anderson Lake to the south and empties into the Taylor River. The lake is periodically stocked with rainbow trout.

== Access ==
The nearest access to Anderson Lake is via Lennox Creek Trail 1001. The trailhead is a short distance beyond the Bare Mountain trailhead on FS Road 57. The first two miles of the trail follow the FS Road 57 corridor, which has been closed at the Bear Creek bridge since 1998.

== Mining ==
The valleys surrounding Dog Mountain have been mined for silver, molybdenum, and copper, including chalcopyrite, by several companies, including Penny Prospector associated with the Buena Vista Mining District, and Pine Marten Prospect, as well as claims by Devil's Canyon and Lennox Mining and Development Company further west. The trails from Lennox Creek Valley still hold remains of equipment and landmarks by the mining activity. Some sections of the trail were part of the mining roads.

== See also ==
- List of lakes of the Alpine Lakes Wilderness
