= Bear Lake (Washington) =

Lake in the Alpine Lakes Wilderness, Washington, United States

- Location within Washington (state) Location within the United States
- Location: King County, Washington
- Coordinates: 47°34′26″N 121°23′39″W
- Primary outflows: Taylor River
- Basin countries: United States
- Surface elevation: 3,615 ft (1,102 m)

Bear Lake is a lake in King County in Washington, United States. It is the source of the Taylor River.

The lake can be reached by hiking 0.7 miles (1.1 km) from Deer Lake along the Snoqualmie Lake Trail which eventually traverses into the Miller River system and reaches the shore of Lake Dorothy.

The lake is located just upstream from Deer Lake. The Taylor River actually drops over a small waterfall after exiting the lake which is said to be visible from across Deer Lake.

== See also ==
- List of lakes in Washington
