= Otter Falls =

Otter Falls may refer to:

- Otter Falls (Yukon)
- Otter Falls (Washington)
