= Big Snow Lake =

Lake in Washingtion state, U.S.

- Location within Washington (state) Location within the United States
- Location: King County, Washington, United States
- Coordinates: 47.543367°N 121.36983°W
- Basin countries: United States
- Surface area: 14.4 acres (0.058 km^{2})
- Surface elevation: 4,915 ft (1,498 m)

Big Snow Lake is a freshwater lake located on the northern slope of Big Snow Mountain, west of Dutch Miller Gap, in King County, Washington. Big Snow Lake shares the ridge with Snowflake Lake and is a short distance from Myrtle Lake, to the West, Fools Gold Lake over its northern slope and Little Bulger Ridge further off the northwest shore of Myrtle Lake.

== See also ==
- List of lakes of the Alpine Lakes Wilderness
