= Columbia River Gorge =

Canyon along the border of Oregon and Washington in the United States

Coordinates: 45°42′17″N 121°47′30″W

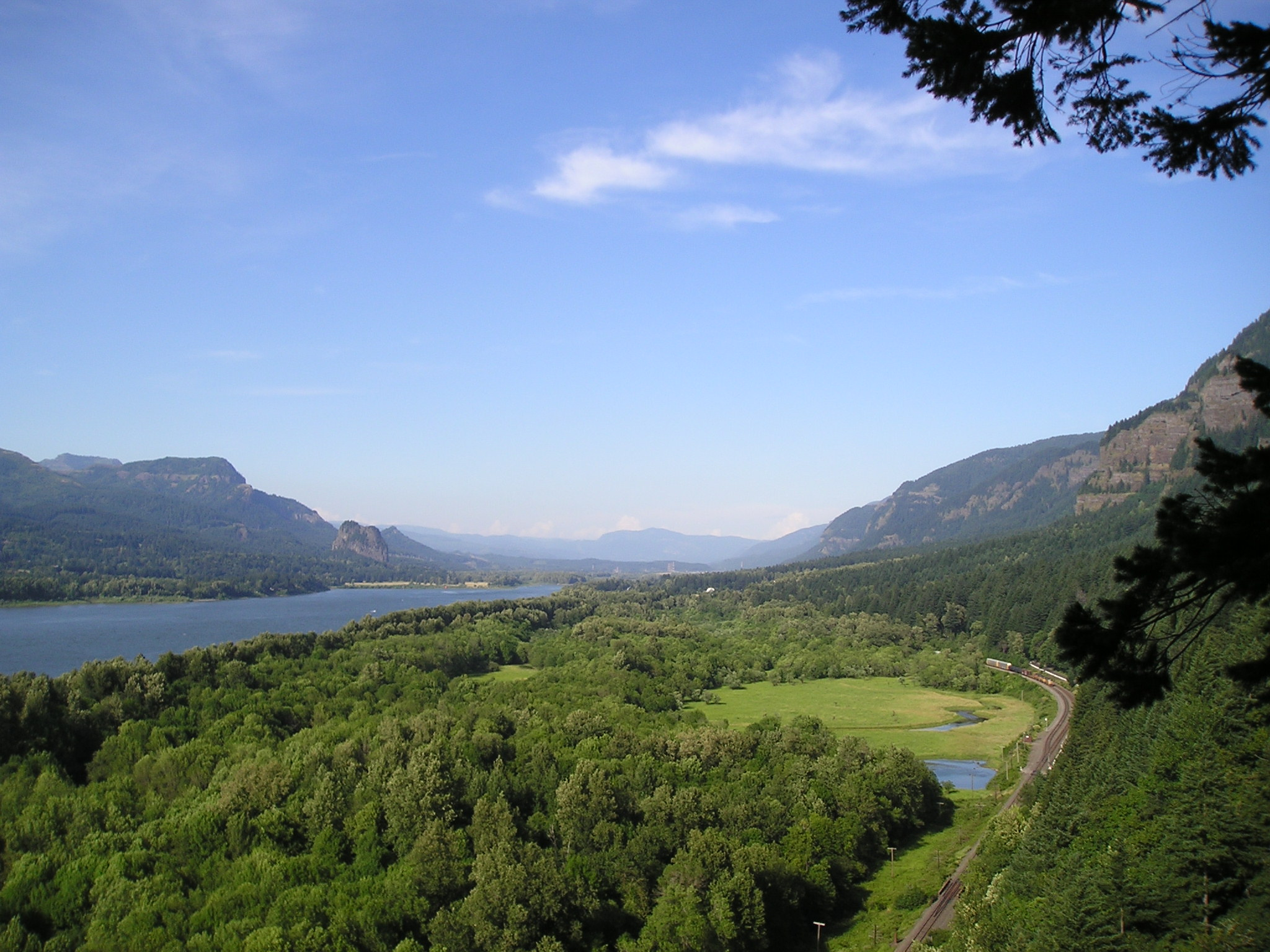
- Looking east up the Columbia River Gorge from near Multnomah Falls.

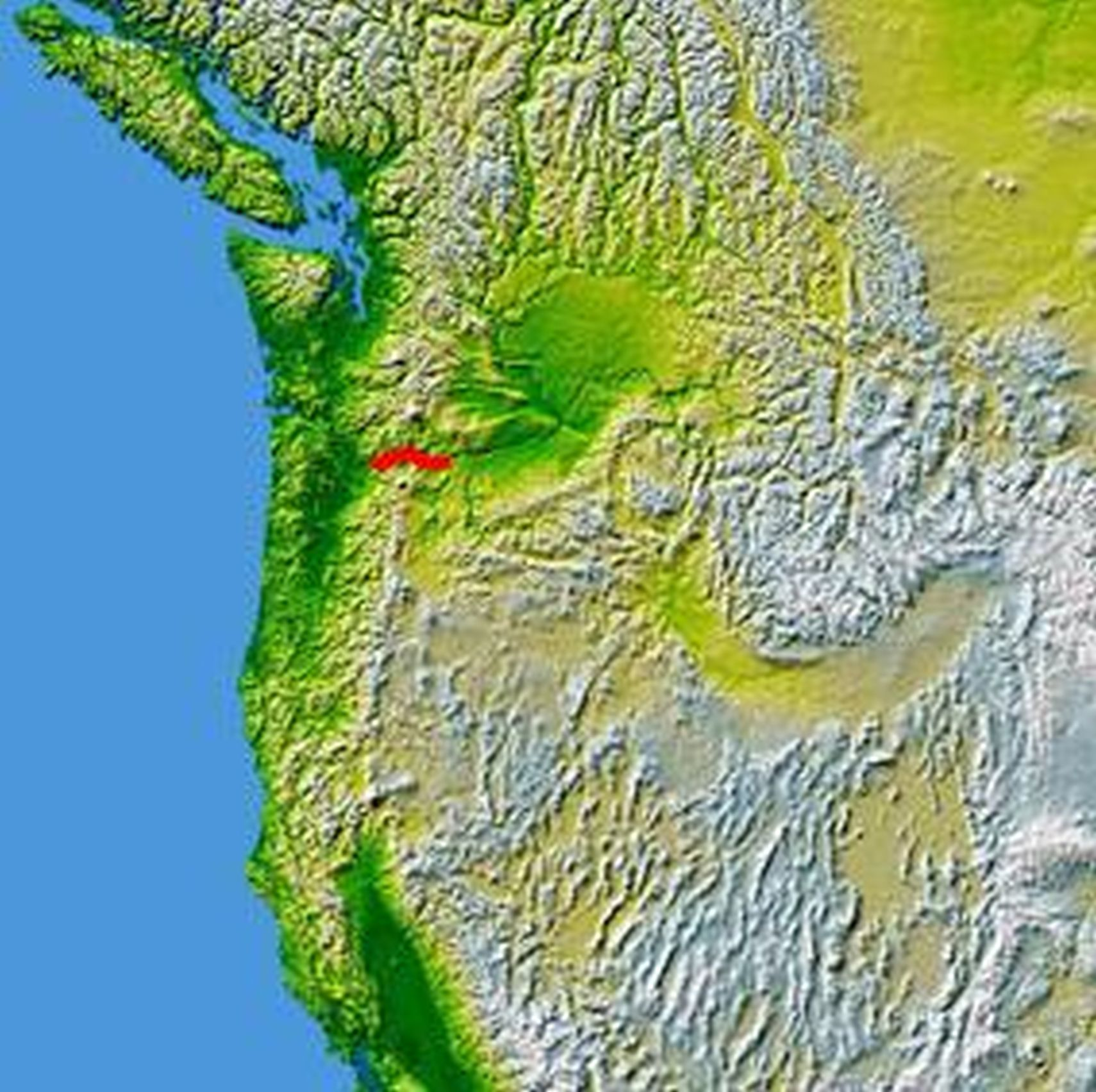
- Location: Pacific Northwest, United States
- Established: 1986
- Website: www.fs.usda.gov/crgnsa

The Columbia River Gorge is a canyon of the Columbia River in the Pacific Northwest of the United States. Up to 4,000 feet (1,200 m) deep, the canyon stretches for over eighty miles (130 km) as the river winds westward through the Cascade Range, forming the boundary between the state of Washington to the north and Oregon to the south. Extending roughly from the confluence of the Columbia with the Deschutes River (and the towns of Roosevelt, Washington, and Arlington, Oregon) in the east down to the eastern reaches of the Portland metropolitan area, the water gap furnishes the only navigable route through the Cascades and the only water connection between the Columbia Plateau and the Pacific Ocean. It is thus that the routes of Interstate 84, U.S. Route 30, Washington State Route 14, and railroad tracks on both sides run through the gorge.

A popular recreational destination, the gorge holds federally protected status as the Columbia River Gorge National Scenic Area and is managed by the Columbia River Gorge Commission and the U.S. Forest Service.

== Description ==
The Columbia River, Klamath River in northern California, Pit River in northern California, and Fraser River in southern British Columbia are the only four rivers connecting the watersheds on the east side of the Cascade Range to the Pacific Ocean. Each river has carved out a gorge through the Cascades. The Columbia River Gorge marks the state line between Oregon and Washington, and its wide range of elevation and precipitation makes it an extremely diverse and dynamic place. Ranging from 4,000 feet (1,200 m) to sea level, and transitioning from 100 inches (2,500 mm) of precipitation to only 10 inches (250 mm) in 80 miles (130 km), the gorge provides the setting for a diverse collection of ecosystems, from the temperate rain forest on the western end—with an average annual precipitation of 75 to 100 inches (1,900 to 2,500 mm)—to the eastern grasslands with average annual precipitation between 10 and 15 inches (250 and 380 mm), to a transitional dry woodland between Hood River and The Dalles. Isolated micro-habitats have allowed for many species of endemic plants and animals to prosper, including at least 13 endemic wildflowers.

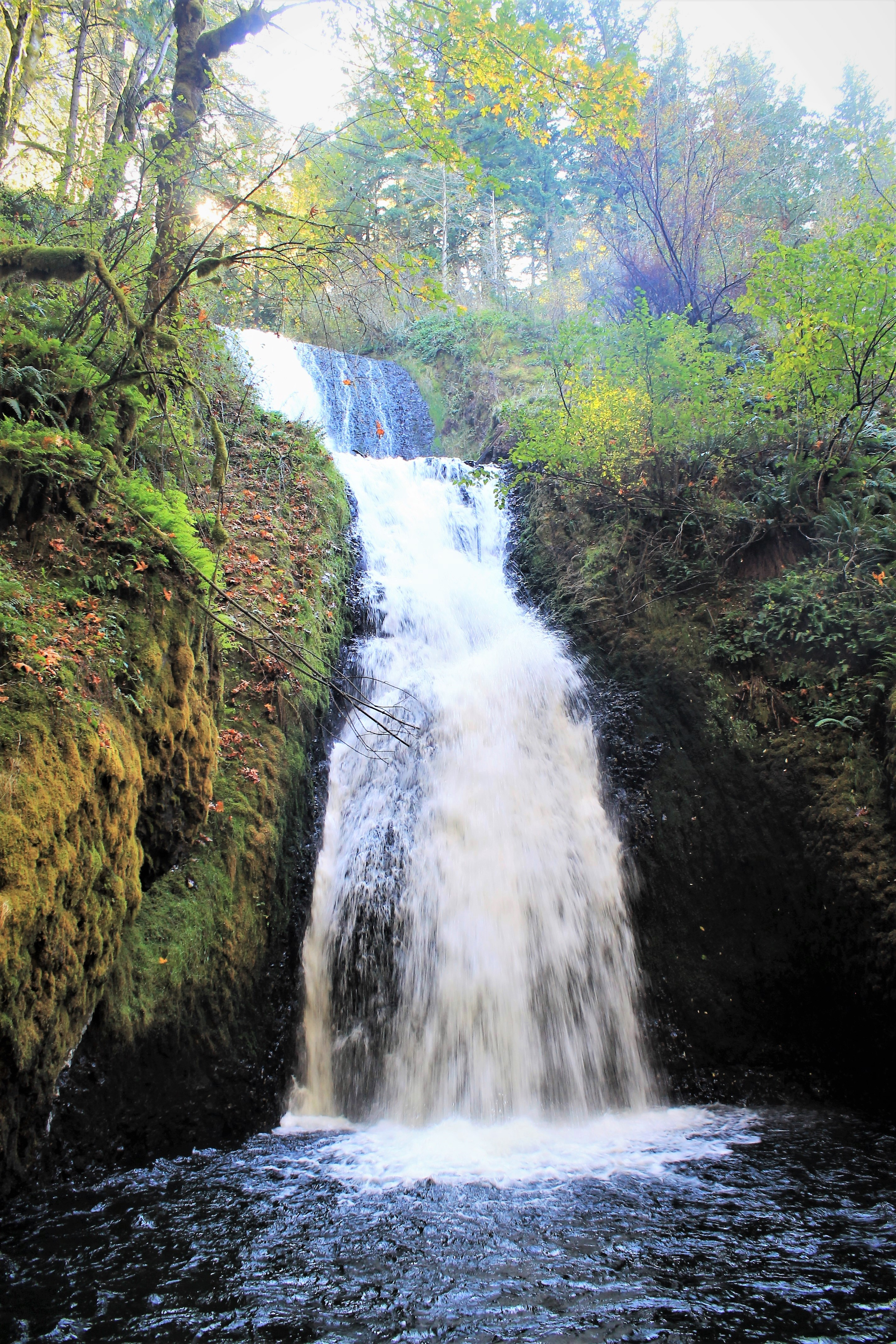
Bridal Veil Falls in autumn

The gorge transitions between temperate rainforest to dry grasslands in only 80 miles (130 km), hosting a dramatic change in scenery while driving along Interstate 84. In the western, temperate rainforest areas, forests are marked by bigleaf maples, Douglas fir, and western hemlock, all covered in epiphytes. In the transition zone (between Hood River and The Dalles), vegetation turns to Oregon white oak, ponderosa pine, and cottonwood. At the eastern end, the forests make way for expansive grasslands, with occasional pockets of lodgepole and ponderosa pine.

Atmospheric pressure differentials east and west of the Cascades create a wind tunnel effect in the deep cut of the gorge, generating 35-mile-per-hour (56 km/h) winds that make it a popular windsurfing and kiteboarding location. It also creates the right conditions for snow and ice storms during the winter months which also draw very cold east winds toward the mouth of the gorge on the west end.

The gorge is a popular destination for hiking, biking, sightseeing, fishing, and water sports. The area is known for its high concentration of waterfalls, with over 90 on the Oregon side of the gorge alone. Many are along the Historic Columbia River Highway, including the notable 620-foot-high (190 m) Multnomah Falls.

Trails and day use sites are maintained by the Forest Service and many Oregon and Washington state parks.

== Geology ==
The Columbia River Gorge began forming as far back as the Miocene (roughly 17 to 12 million years ago), and continued to take shape through the Pleistocene (2 million to 700,000 years ago). During this period the Cascade Range was forming, which slowly moved the Columbia River's delta about 100 miles (160 km) north to its current location.

Although the river slowly eroded the land over this period of time, the most drastic changes took place at the end of the last ice age when the Missoula Floods cut the steep, dramatic walls that exist today, flooding the river as high up as Crown Point. This quick erosion left many layers of volcanic rock exposed.

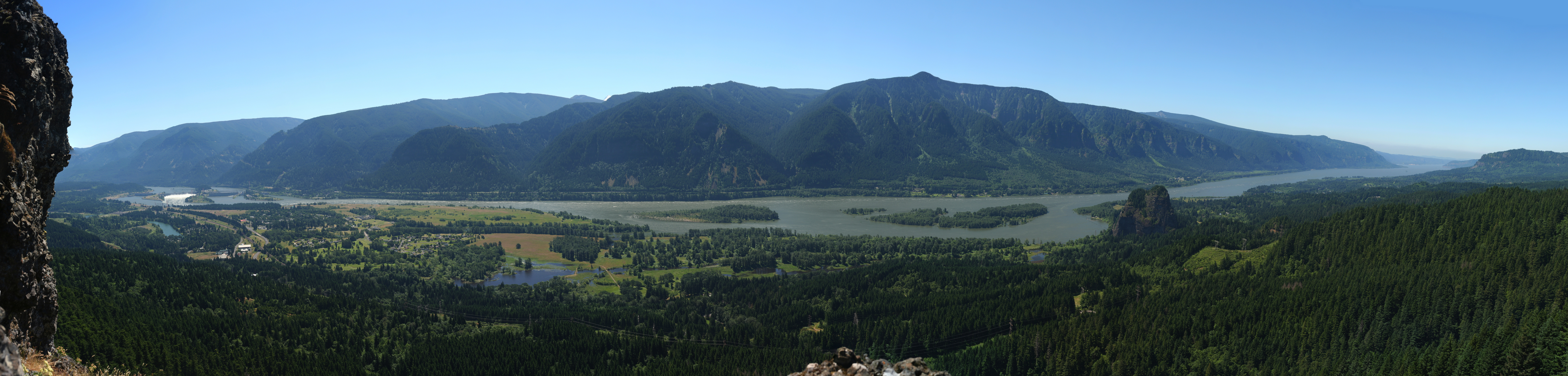
A view of the Columbia River Gorge from near the top of Mt. Hamilton, looking south from the Washington side of the gorge. On the far left side of the image, the Bonneville Dam is visible. On the left-center is the small town of North Bonneville. Behind the hills in the center of the image, the peak of Mt. Hood is just barely visible. The large rock at the river's edge on the right side is Beacon Rock, which is 848 feet (258 m) tall. The high point to the right of center is Nesmith Point, the highest point on the rim of the gorge at 3,848 feet (1,173 m).

== Ecology ==
The Columbia River Gorge is home to a number of plant species that are endemic or found mostly in the gorge and surrounding areas, Lomatium columbianum, Lomatium klickitatense, Lomatium suksdorfii, Penstemon barrettiae, and Primula poetica.

== History ==
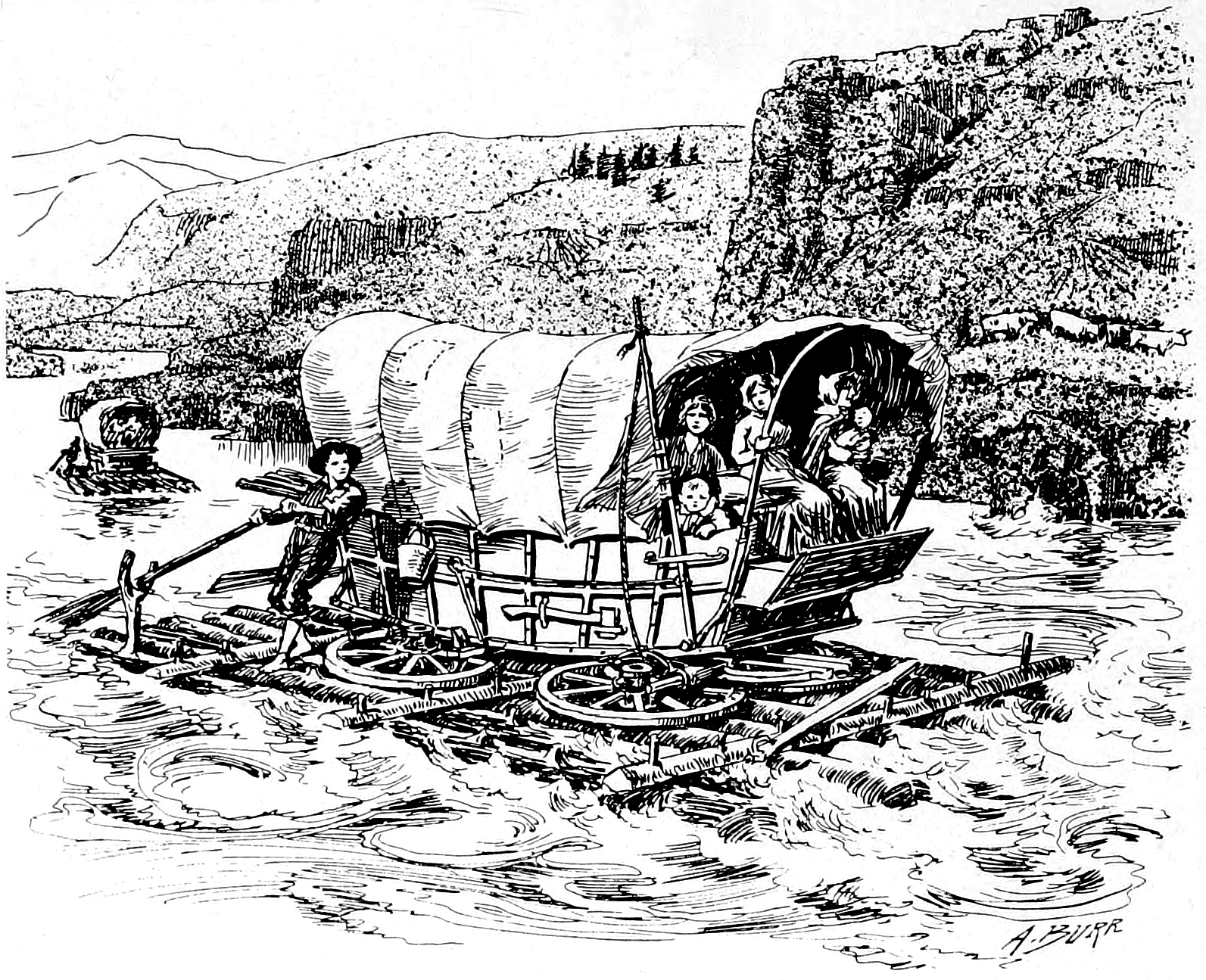
Prior to the construction of the Barlow Road, the only practical option for many immigrants to the Willamette Valley along the Oregon Trail was to convert their wagons into rafts at the Dalles. Many died or lost their possessions in the attempt to convey their wagons via rafts through the Cascades Rapids.

The gorge has supported human habitation for over 13,000 years. Evidence of the Folsom and Marmes people, who crossed the Bering land bridge from Asia, were found in archaeological digs. Excavations near Celilo Falls, a few miles east of The Dalles, show humans have occupied this salmon-fishing site for more than 10,000 years.

The gorge has provided a transportation corridor for thousands of years. Native Americans would travel through the gorge to trade at Celilo Falls, both along the river and over Lolo Pass on the north side of Mount Hood. In 1805, the route was used by the Lewis and Clark Expedition to reach the Pacific. Early European and American settlers subsequently established steamboat lines and railroads through the gorge. Today, the BNSF Railway runs freights along the Washington side of the river, while its rival, the Union Pacific Railroad, runs freights along the Oregon shore. Until 1997, Amtrak's Pioneer also used the Union Pacific tracks. The Portland segment of the Empire Builder uses the BNSF tracks that pass through the gorge.

The Columbia River Highway, built in the early 20th century, was the first major paved highway in the Pacific Northwest. Shipping was greatly simplified after Bonneville Dam and The Dalles Dam submerged the gorge's major rapids such as Celilo Falls, a major salmon fishing site for local Native Americans until the site's submergence in 1957.

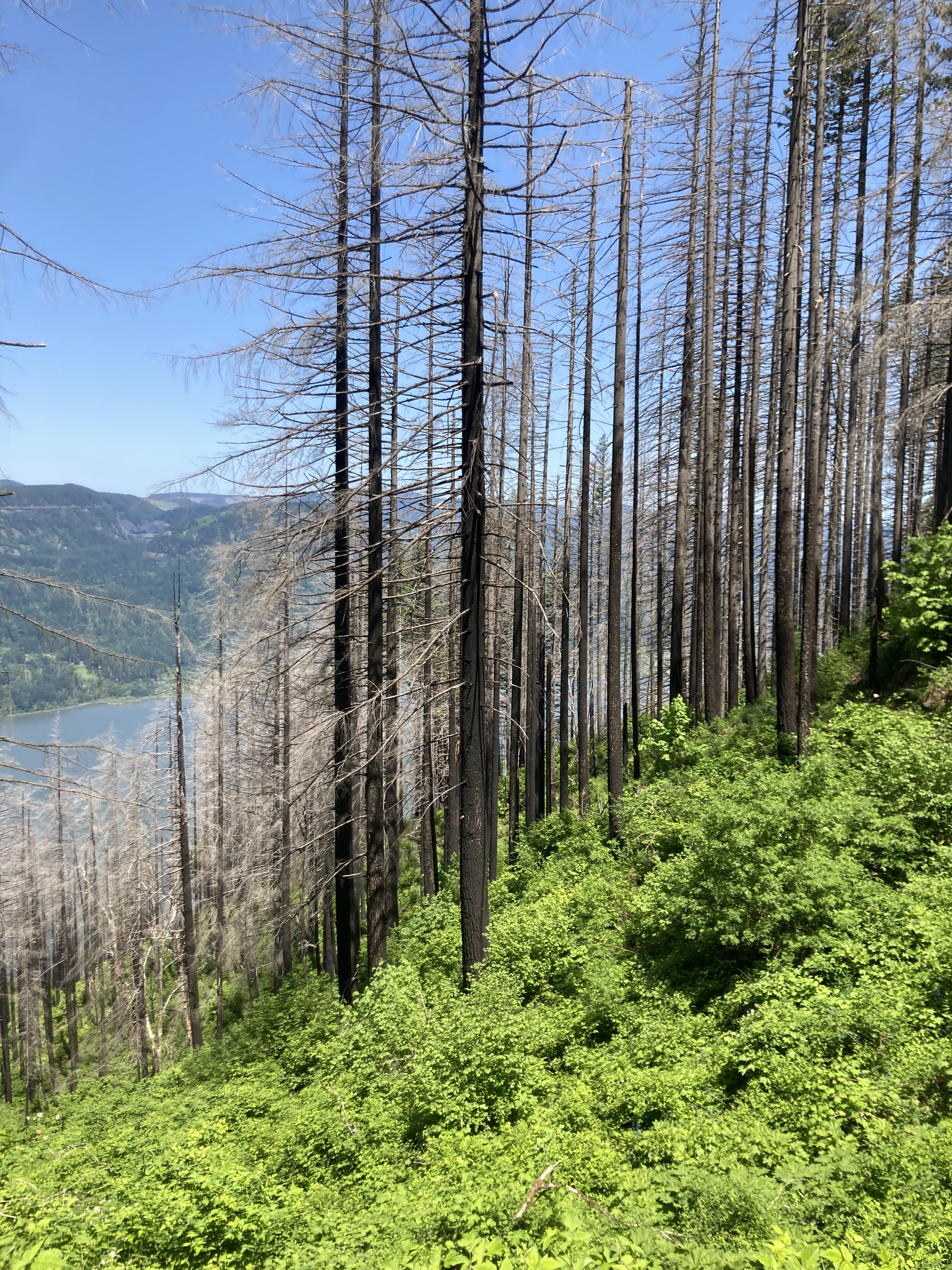
Trees damaged by the Eagle Creek Fire. New undergrowth is visible.

In November 1986, Congress made the gorge the second U.S. National Scenic Area and established the Columbia River Gorge Commission as part of an interstate compact. The experimental designation came in lieu of being recognized as a national park, which would require the existing industries in towns along the river to relocate. The designation was initially opposed by residents fearing government encroachment, due to restrictions in the plan for items such as building paint colors, and was also opposed by conservationists who feared additional development in the region. In 2004, the gorge became the namesake of the Columbia Gorge American Viticultural Area, a 4,432-acre (1,794 ha) area located on both sides of the river.

In fall 2017, the Eagle Creek Fire burned in the gorge for three months, consuming almost 50,000 acres (78 sq mi; 200 km^{2}). It reached 100% containment on November 30, 2017, but was not yet completely out.

== Gallery ==
Vistas and landscape
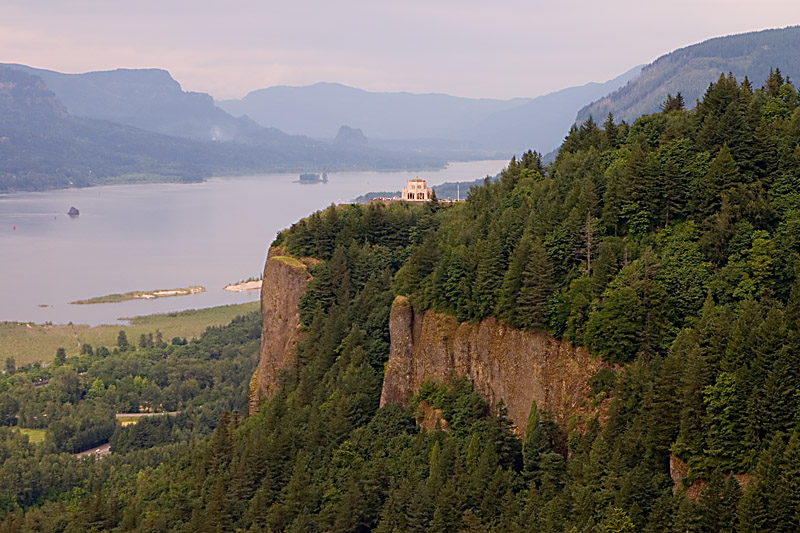
Crown Point in the Columbia River Gorge, looking upstream from Chanticleer Point

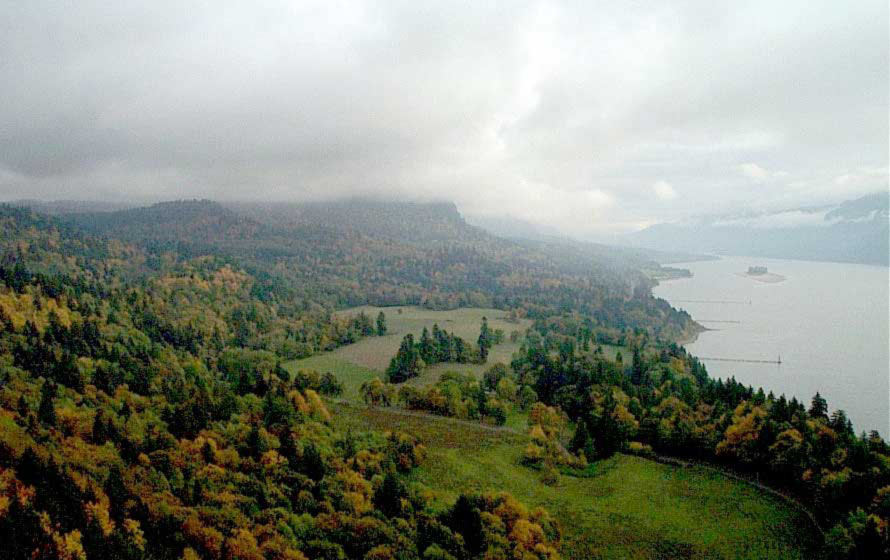
Columbia River Gorge, photographed from the southern edge of the Gifford Pinchot National Forest

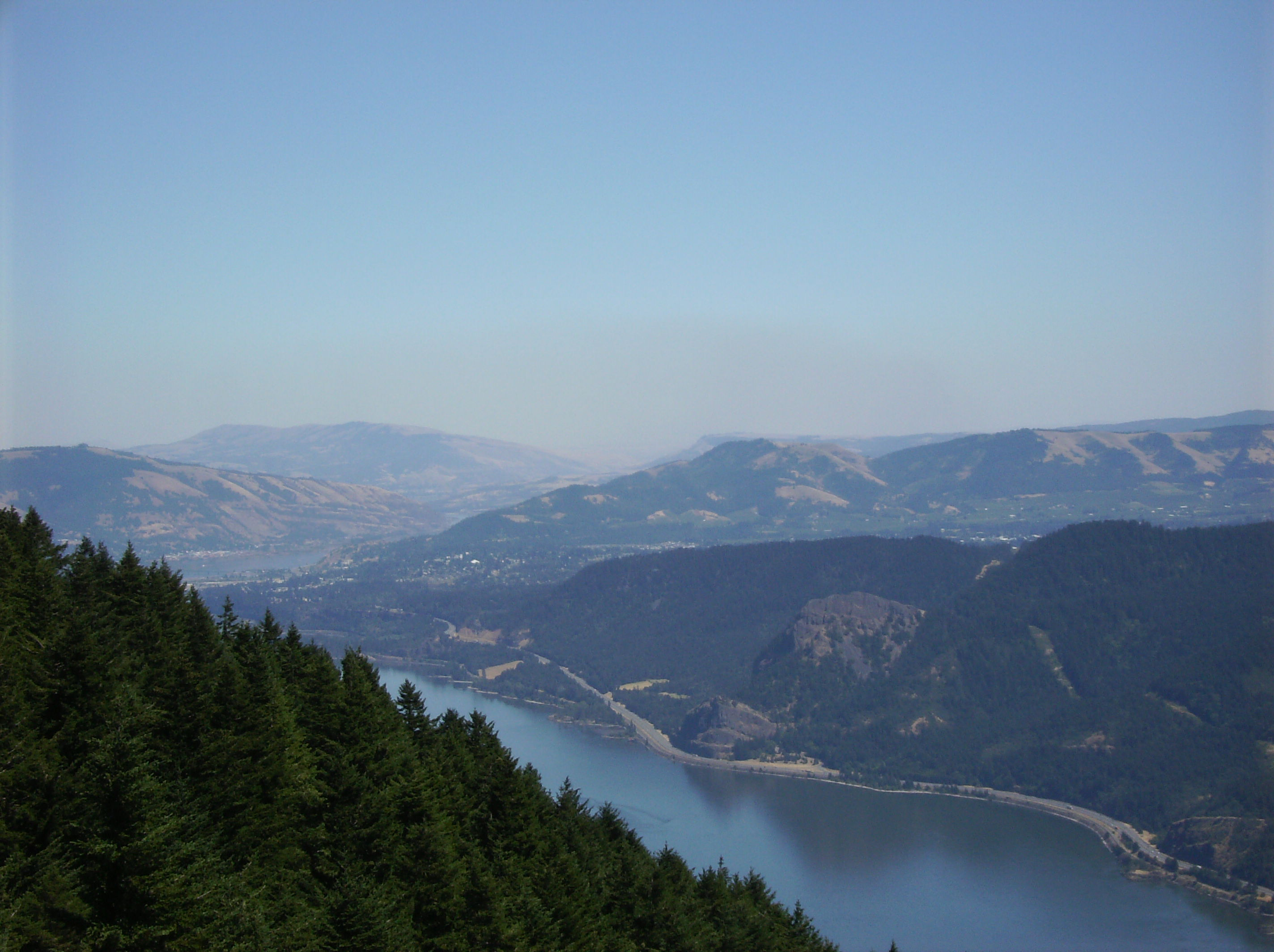
The view east towards The Dalles from Dog Mountain

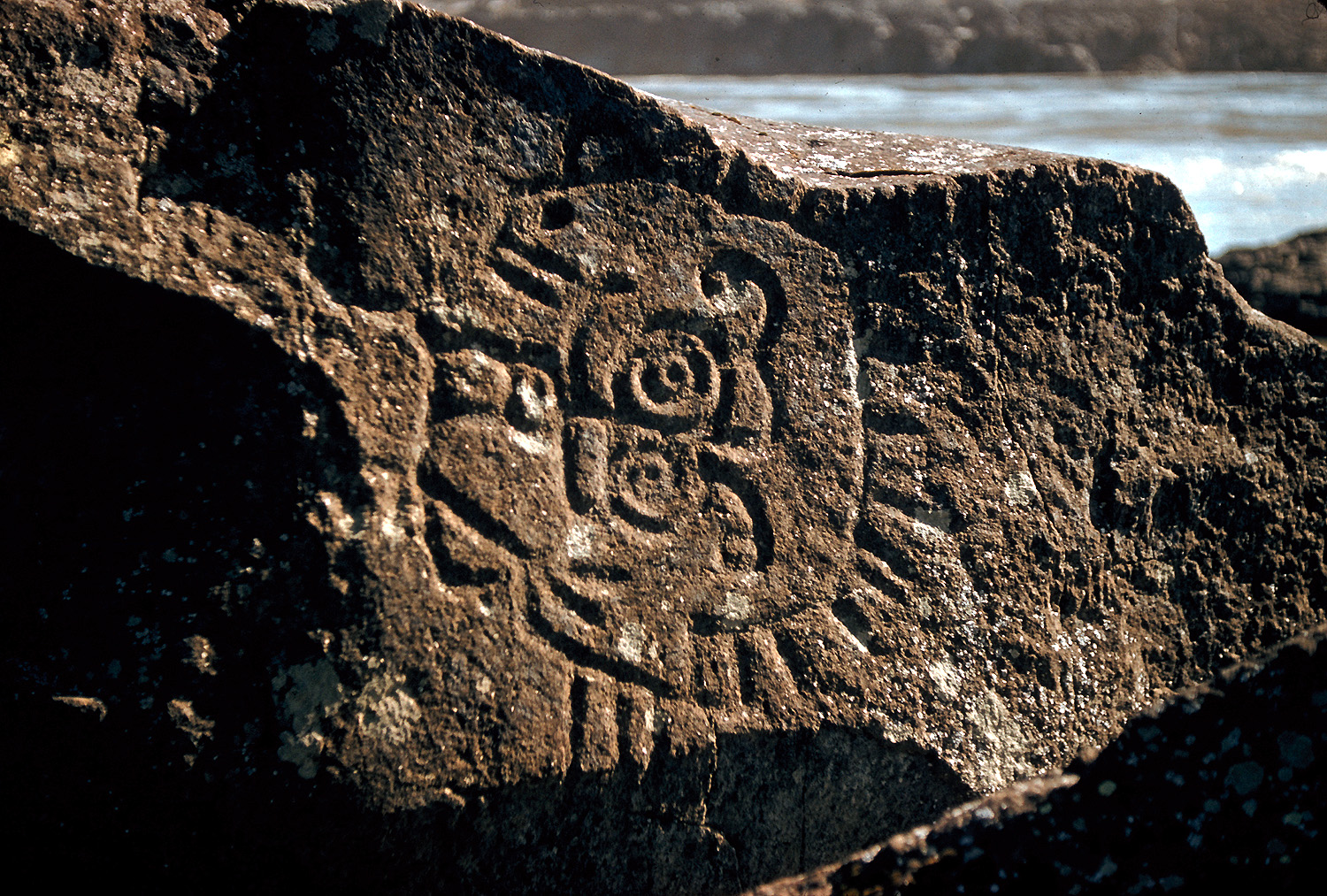
Native American petroglyphs in the Columbia River Gorge near The Dalles Dam

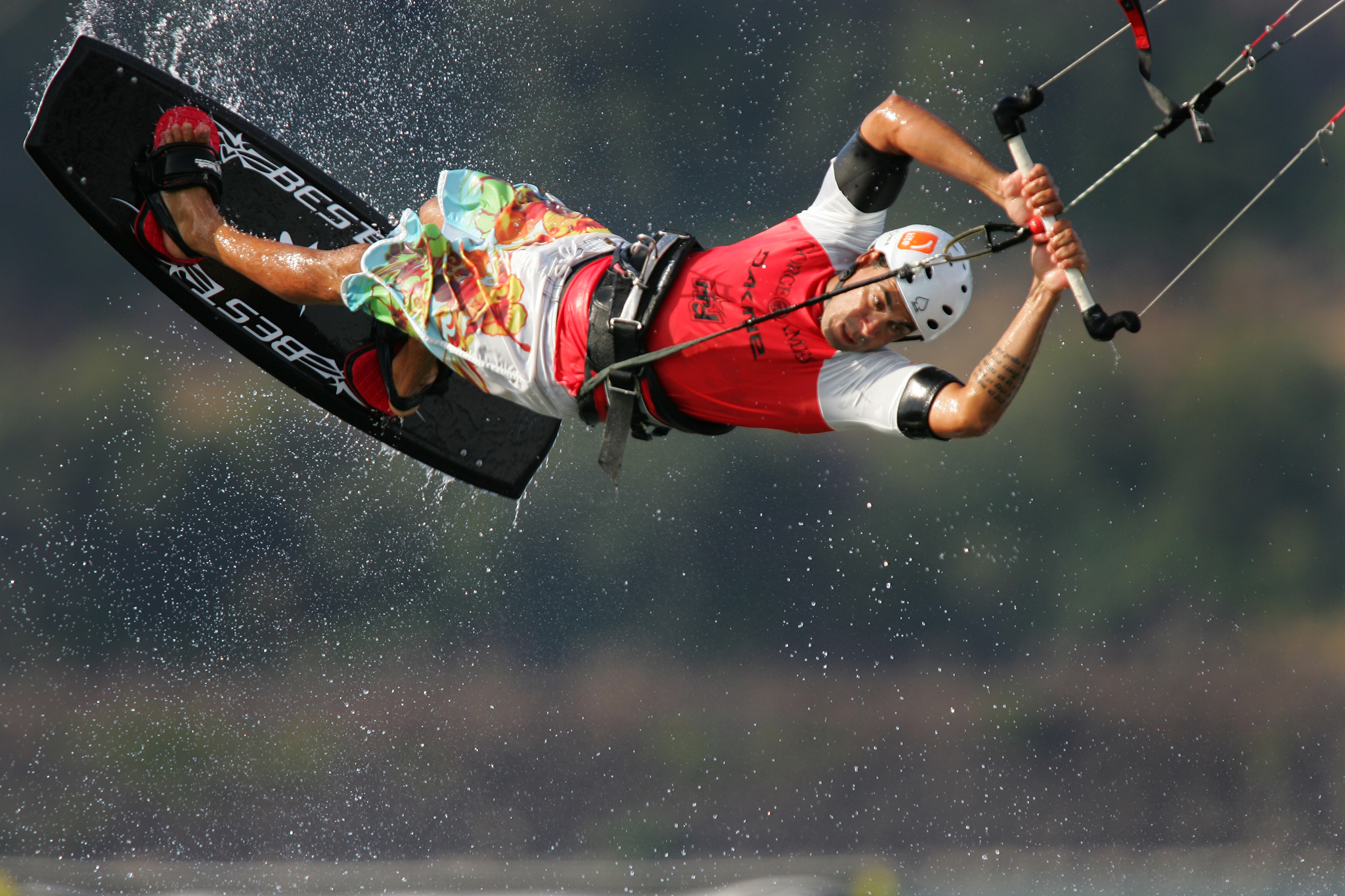
Kitesurfing on the Columbia River

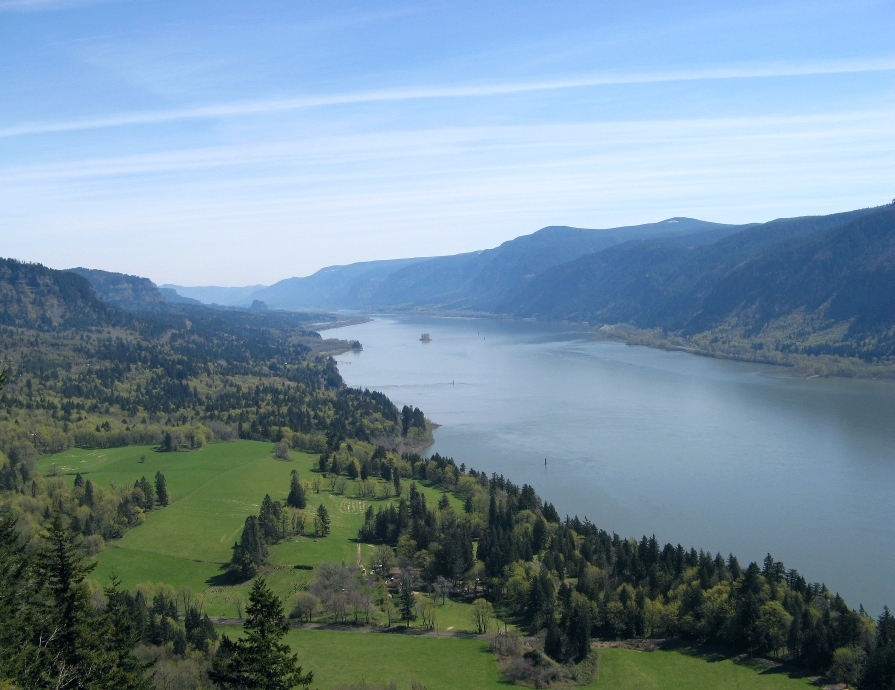
View of Columbia River Gorge from Cape Horn Trail, looking east toward Beacon Rock

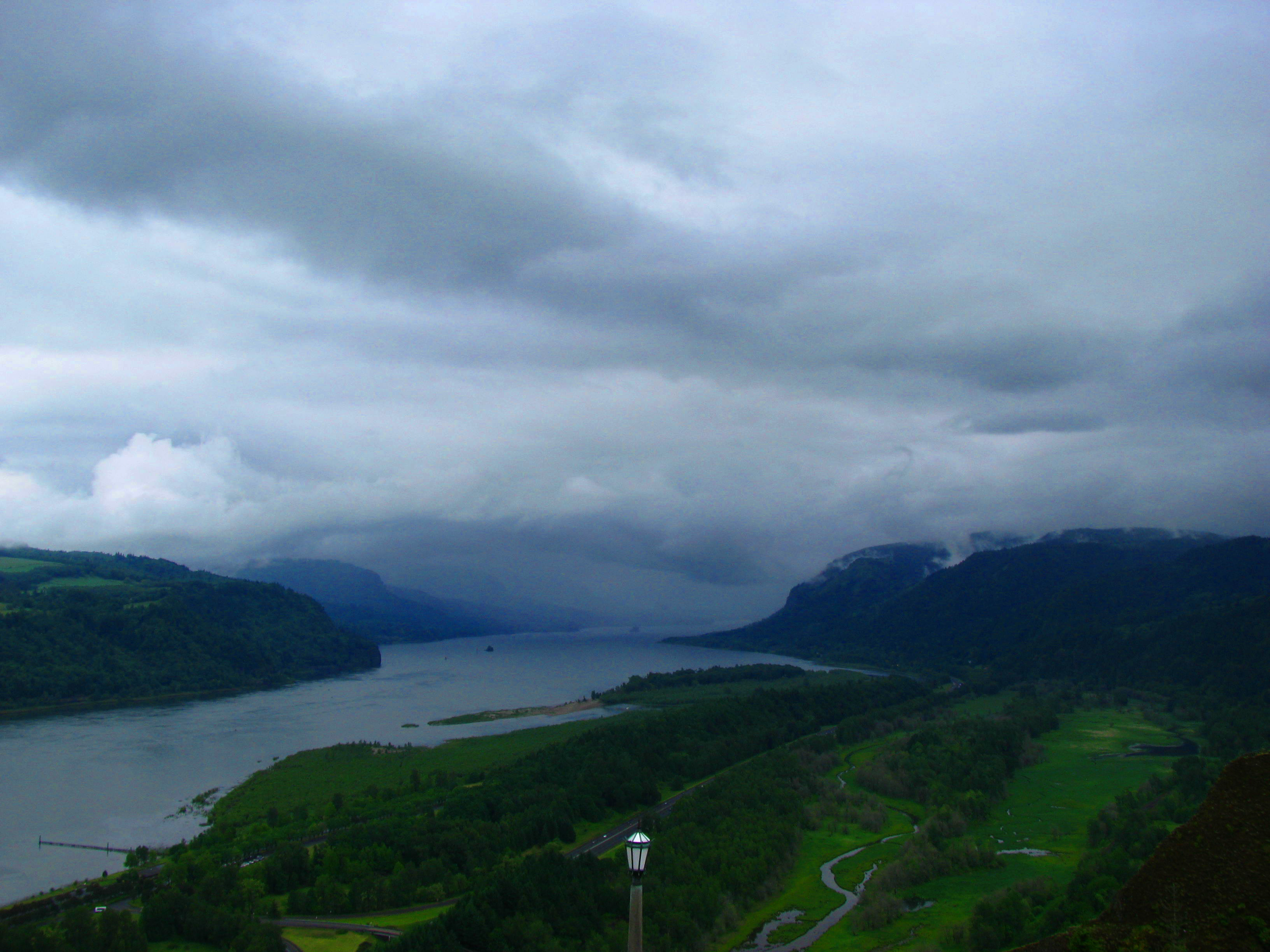
Columbia River Gorge, photographed from Crown Point.

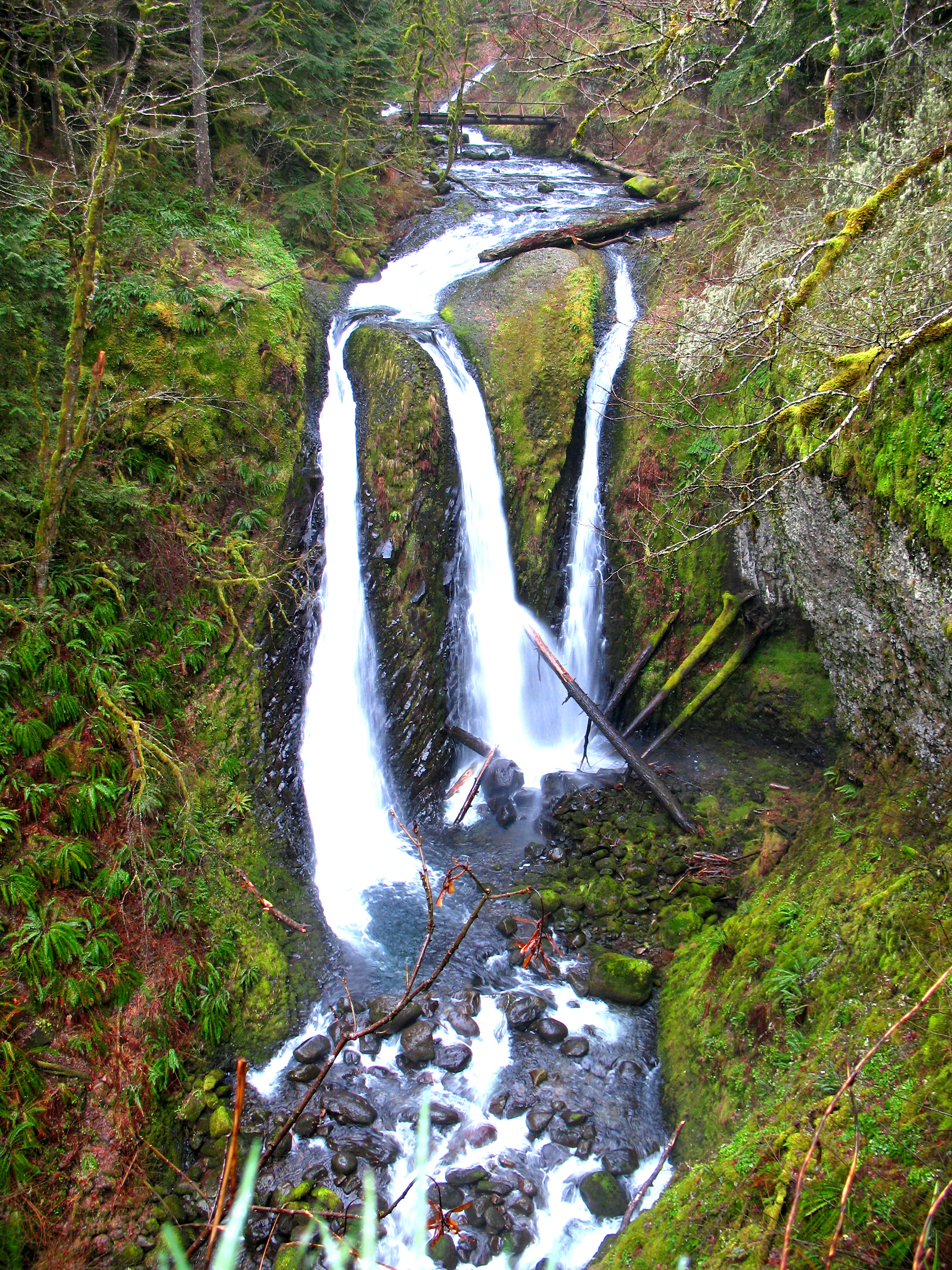
Triple Falls

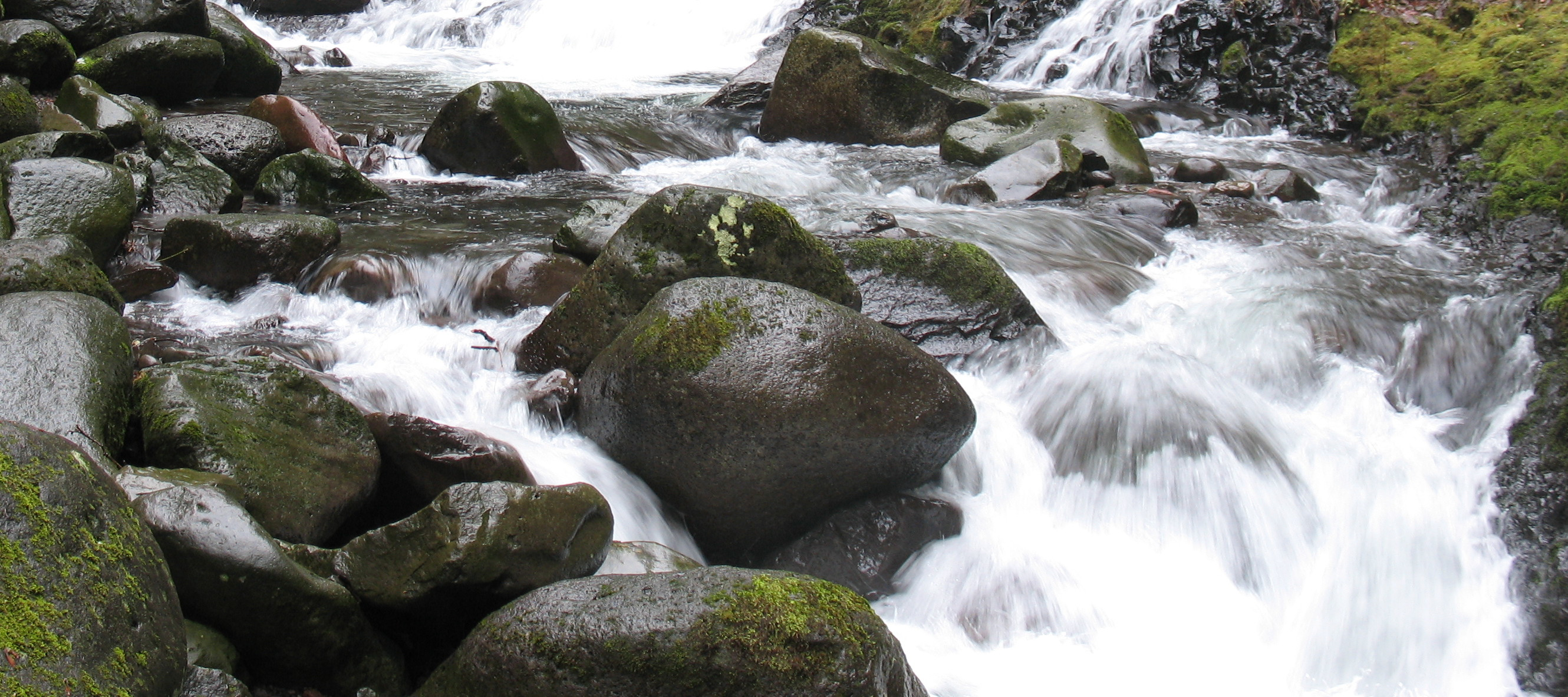
Oneonta Creek

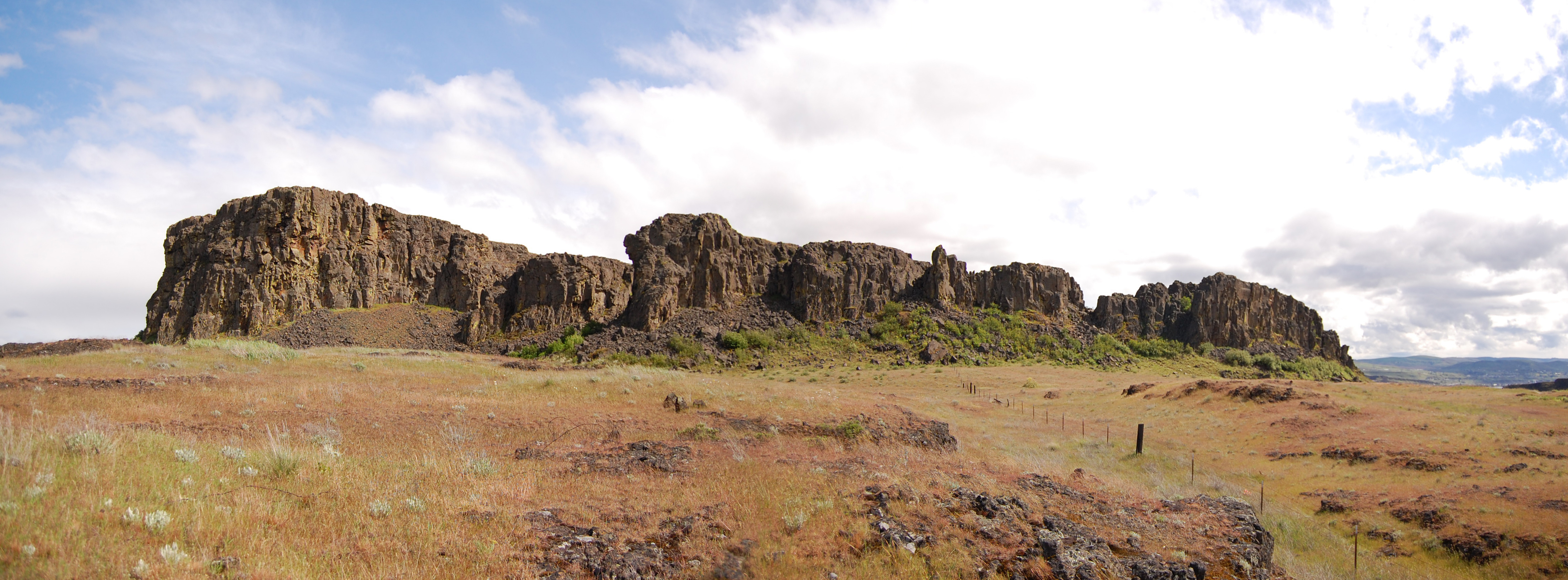
Horsethief Butte, near The Dalles

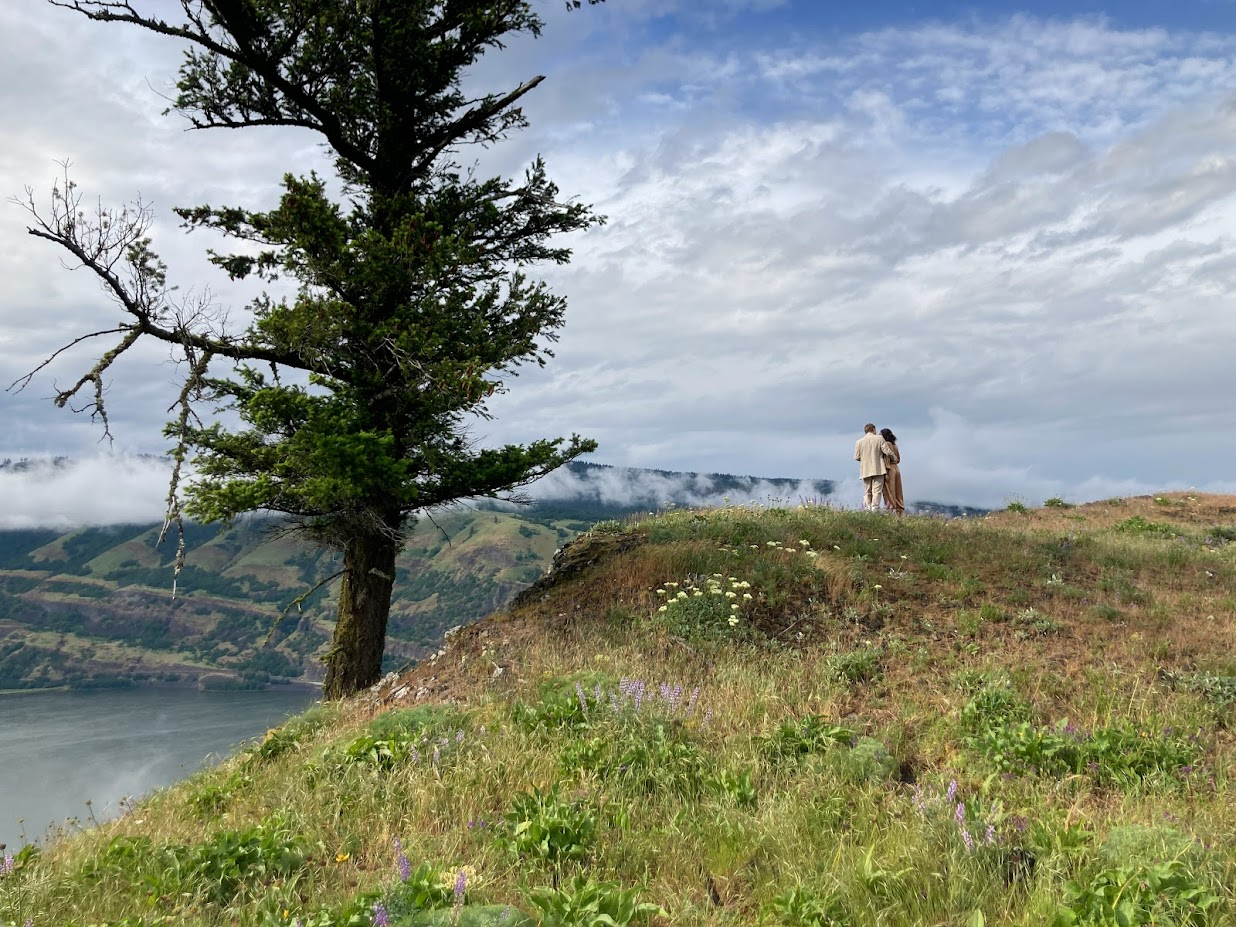
A couple overlooks the Columbia River Gorge from a viewpoint near Mosier, Oregon

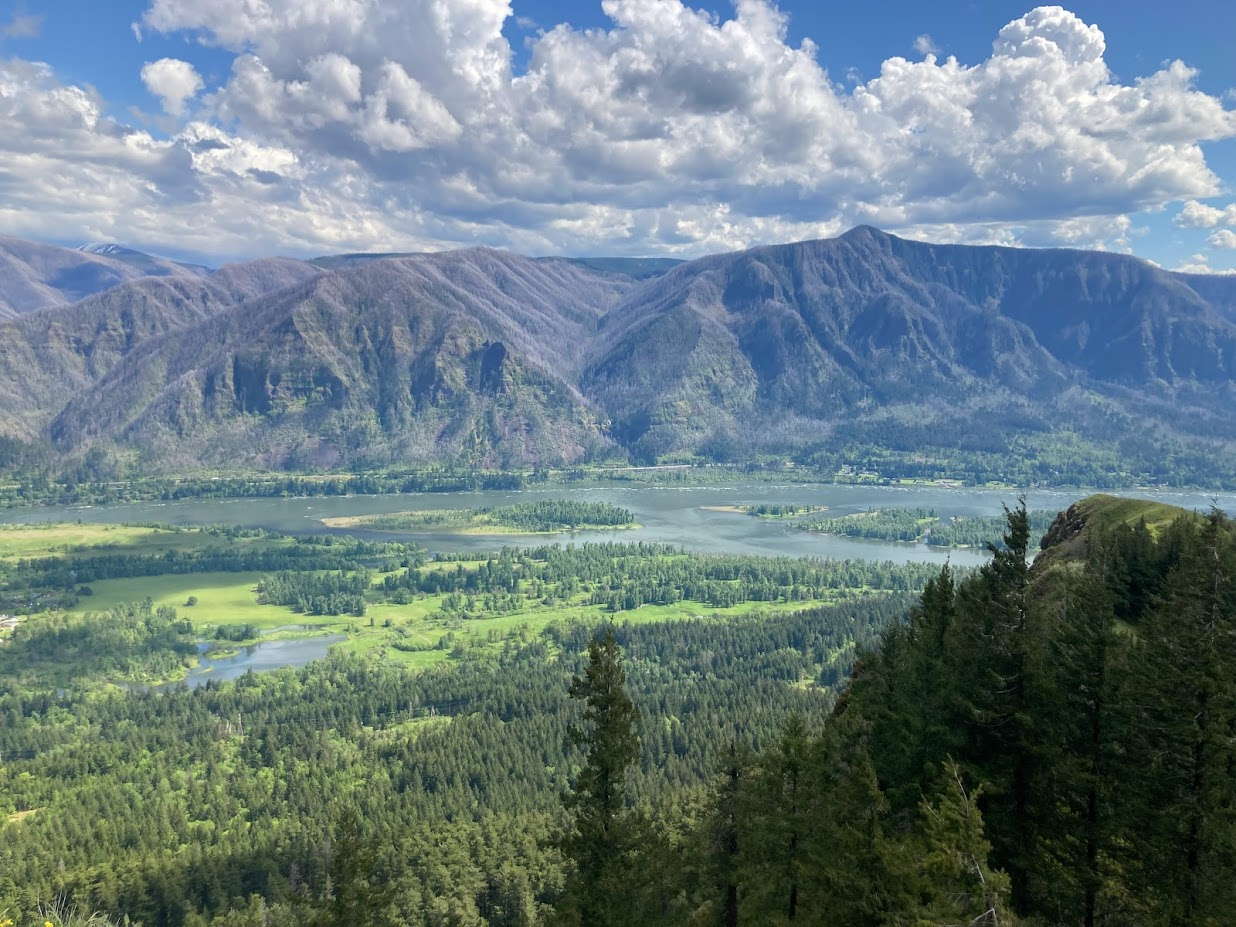
A view of the Oregon side of the Columbia River Gorge from Hamilton Mountain

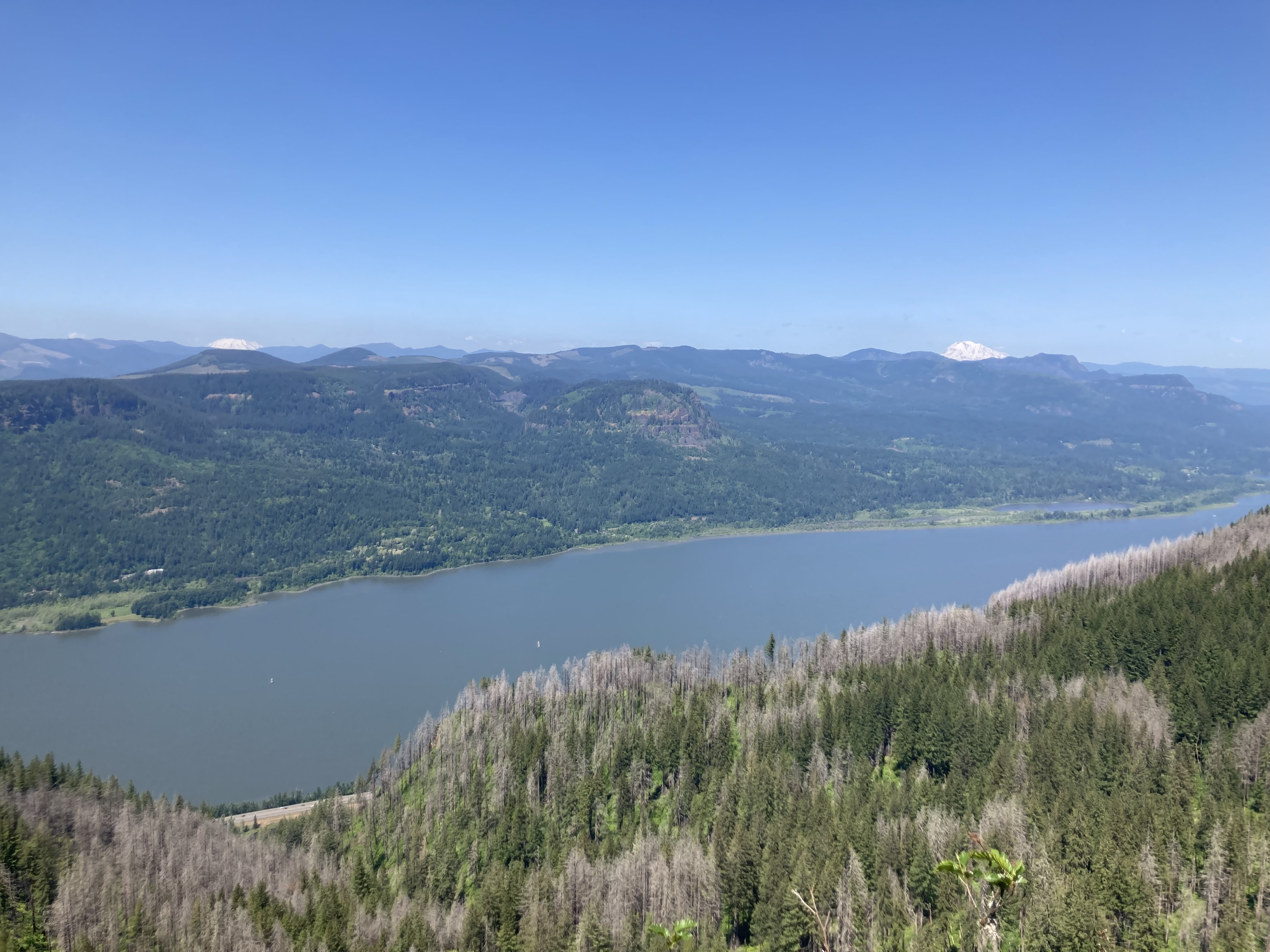
Columbia River Gorge with Mount Adams and Mount Saint Helens barely visible, seen from the Devils Rest Trail

== See also ==
- Barlow Road, the first wagon-compatible pioneer road to provide a safer alternative to traveling through the gorge
- Cascades Rapids
- Proposed Columbia Gorge casino, a proposed off-reservation casino in Cascade Locks
- Wahclella Falls
- Nancy Neighbor Russell, conservationist and co-founder of Friends of the Columbia Gorge
