= Deer Lake (Taylor River) =

Lake in the King County, Washington

- Location within Washington (state) Location within the United States
- Location: King County, Washington, United States
- Coordinates: 47.5709°N 121.4013°W
- Primary inflows: Taylor River
- Primary outflows: Taylor River
- Basin countries: United States
- Surface elevation: 3,587 feet (1,093 m)

Deer Lake is a lake in King County, Washington. It is an expansion of the Taylor River, located just below its true source. Located a short distance downstream is Snoqualmie Lake.

The lake is reached by hiking 1 mile from Snoqualmie Lake. Deer and Bear Lake are both about the same size.

The river drops over a small waterfall just before flowing into the lake. Shortly below the outlet is a long cascade that likely extends much of the way to Snoqualmie Lake.

== See also ==
- List of lakes in Washington
