= Miller River Waterfalls =

Waterfalls in Washington (state), United States

There are a total of 3 waterfalls on the 2 forks of the Miller River. Below is a description for all of them:

== East Fork ==
=== Florence Falls ===
Florence Falls
- Location: King County, Washington, United States
- Type: Tiered
- Total height: 140 feet (43 m)
- Number of drops: 4
- Total width: 20 feet (6.1 m)
- Watercourse: East Fork Miller River

Florence Falls, at 47°35′59″N 121°23′00″W, is located a short distance downstream from Lake Dorothy. The falls are a long cascade totaling about 140 feet (43 m). The falls are made up of several small drops, none over 20 feet high, and can be just a trickle when the river is really low or likely quite large when the river is high.

The location of this waterfall is often marked on older maps as being just downstream of the mouth of Smith Creek. The true location is just below the outlet of Lake Dorothy, at a bend in the river. The falls are located within a narrow gorge.

== West Fork ==
=== Borderline Falls ===
Borderline Falls
- Location: King County, Washington, United States
- Type: Cascade
- Total height: 20 feet (6.1 m)
- Number of drops: 1
- Total width: 10 feet (3.0 m)
- Watercourse: West Fork Miller River

Borderline Falls, at 47°39′33″N 121°24′44″W, is located about 1.5 miles upstream from the mouth of the West Fork and about 0.6 miles above Immigration Falls. They occur where the river is squeezed between two large granite slabs and cascades for about 20 feet. It got its name due to the number of kayakers who run it as well as the river above or below the falls.

=== Immigration Falls ===
Immigration Falls
- Location: King County, Washington, United States
- Type: Horsetail
- Total height: 20 feet (6.1 m)
- Number of drops: 1
- Total width: 10 feet (3.0 m)
- Watercourse: West Fork Miller River

Immigration Falls, at 47°39′55″N 121°24′01″W, is located about 0.9 miles above the mouth of the West Fork and about 0.6 miles downstream from Borderline Falls. They occur where the river drops over a huge boulder and into another. It got its name due to the number of kayakers who run it as well as the river above or below the falls.

== See also ==
- Miller River
- Lake Dorothy
