= Dream Lake (Washington) =

Lake in Washington (state)

- Location within Washington (state) Location within the United States
- Location: King County, Washington, United States
- Coordinates: 47.60°N 121.4367°W
- Primary outflows: Big Creek
- Basin countries: United States
- Surface area: 33.2 acres (0.134 km^{2})
- Surface elevation: 3,455 ft (1,053 m)

Dream Lake is a freshwater lake located on the southern slope of Dog Mountain in King County, Washington, United States. It is west of Otter Lake, part of the Alpine Lakes Wilderness. Big Creek, a tributary to the Taylor River, exits Dream Lake into a canyon that produces Big Creek Falls. Because of its proximity to Dog Mountain summit and the cirque of Rooster Mountain to the west, the lake is a popular area for hiking, swimming, and fishing and rainbow trout. Access to Dream Lake is provided through an unmaintained access trail that splits off the Snoqualmie Lake Trail.

A short distance west of Dream Lake is a short side trail that branches off Taylor River Trail, shortly after the crossing of Otter Creek, that leads to Otter Falls, a snow-driven waterfall which drops directly into Lipsy Lake. Marten Lake is further west past Otter Falls.

== See also ==
- List of lakes of the Alpine Lakes Wilderness
