= Nesmith Point =

- Location within Oregon

Highest point
- Elevation: 3,848 ft (1,173 m)
- Prominence: 312 ft (95 m)
- Coordinates: 45°35′16″N 122°00′25″W

Naming
- Etymology: Named for James Nesmith

Geography
- Location: Multnomah County, Oregon
- Parent range: Cascade Range
- Topo map: Multnomah Falls

Geology
- Rock age: Pleistocene
- Mountain type: Volcano
- Rock type: Basalt
- Volcanic field: Boring Lava Field

Nesmith Point is a peak in Multnomah County, Oregon, on the edge of the Columbia River Gorge. Its 3,848 feet (1,173 m) elevation makes it the highest point on the lip of the Gorge. It is located in a remote area of the Mark O. Hatfield Wilderness, a wilderness area within the Mount Hood National Forest, on the boundary of the Bull Run Watershed. A representative of the Boring Lava Field, the point was formed approximately one million years ago. The current appearance of the point is a result of the Missoula Floods, which sheared away the north face of the former mountain.

A fire lookout was previously located at the top of Nesmith Point but has been destroyed. The only road access to Nesmith Point is on forest roads through the closed Bull Run Watershed Management Area, and it is thus only legally accessible by trail. The Nesmith Point Trail #428 ascends to the peak from an Interstate 84 frontage road by climbing the walls of the Gorge through a box canyon. The Horsetail Creek Trail #425 and the Moffett Creek Trail #430 provide alternate routes to Nesmith Point from the west and east respectively, and connect to the rest of the Gorge's trail network.
