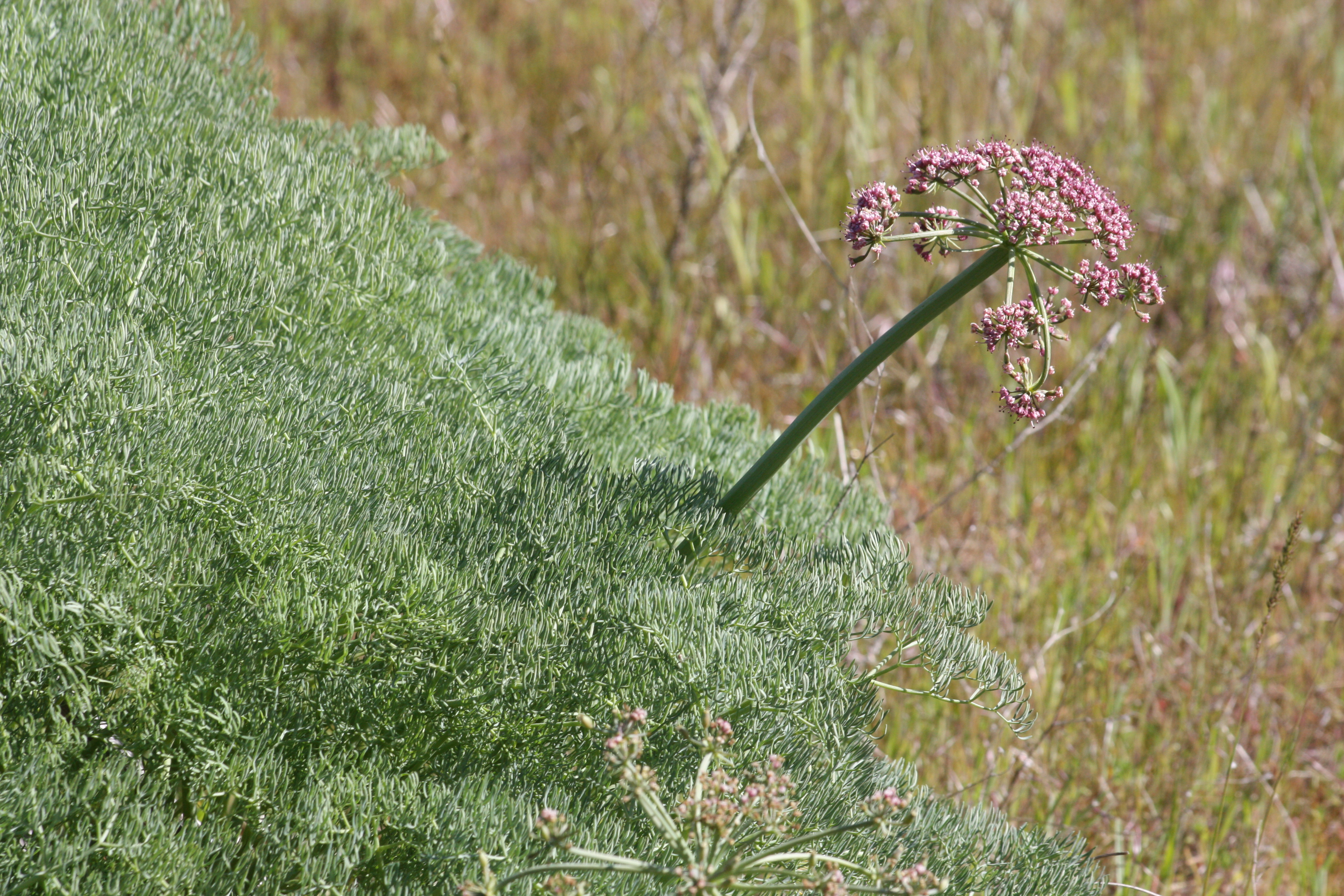
- In Mayer State Park, Oregon

Scientific classification
- Kingdom: Plantae
- Clade: Tracheophytes
- Clade: Angiosperms
- Clade: Eudicots
- Clade: Asterids
- Order: Apiales
- Family: Apiaceae
- Genus: Lomatium
- Species: L. columbianum

Binomial name
- Lomatium columbianum Math. & Const.

= Lomatium columbianum =

Species of flowering plant

Lomatium columbianum is a perennial herb of the family Apiaceae known by the common names purple leptotaenia and Columbia desert parsley. It is endemic to the U.S. states of Oregon and Washington, mostly along the Columbia River east of the Cascades.

== Description ==
Lomatium columbianum is a bushy plant, up to 2 meters tall, with extensively divided stems and leaves with a glaucous, often blue-green, color. The flowers are purple and are held in clusters on thick fleshy stems that arise from the base of the plant. The finely textured foliage is blue-green in color. The erect stems arising from a 30 to 60 centimeters long thick, woody taproot. The stems are leafless in general, but one leaf on the stems are not uncommon. The leaves are from 15 to 30 centimeters in length. The inflorescence is an umbel with 10 to 20 rays, which can range from 10 to 12 centimeters in length at maturity. The petals are usually reddish-purple, but could also be yellow. The fruit is between 16 and 28 millimeters in length.

== Range and Habitat ==
Lomatium columbianum is found in the lower Columbia River basin in Washington and Oregon. It grows in dry rocky soils in full sun. It is found in basalt outcrops and shrub-steppe. It can be found in elevations between 100' and 3700'.

== Gallery ==
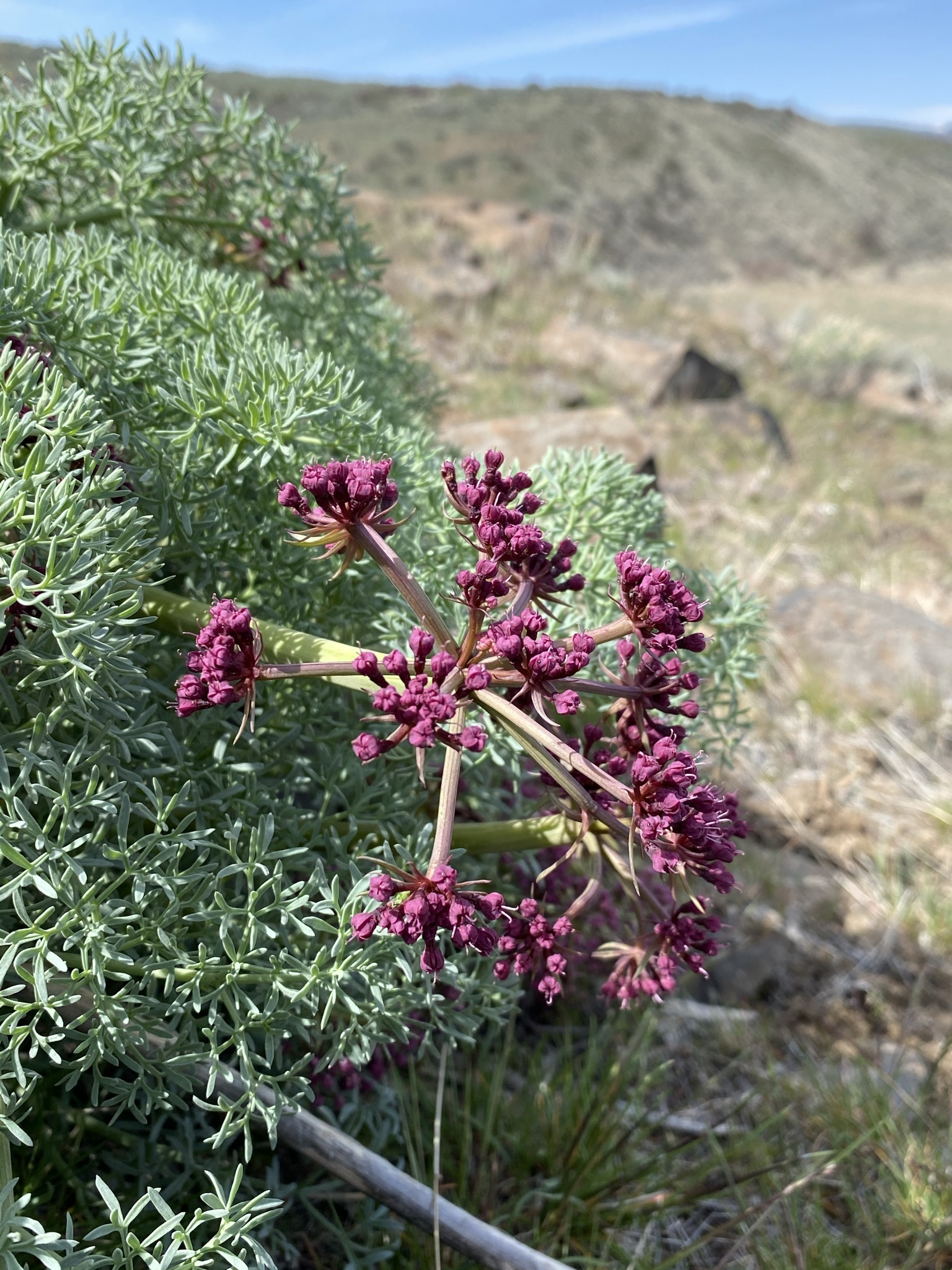
In flower

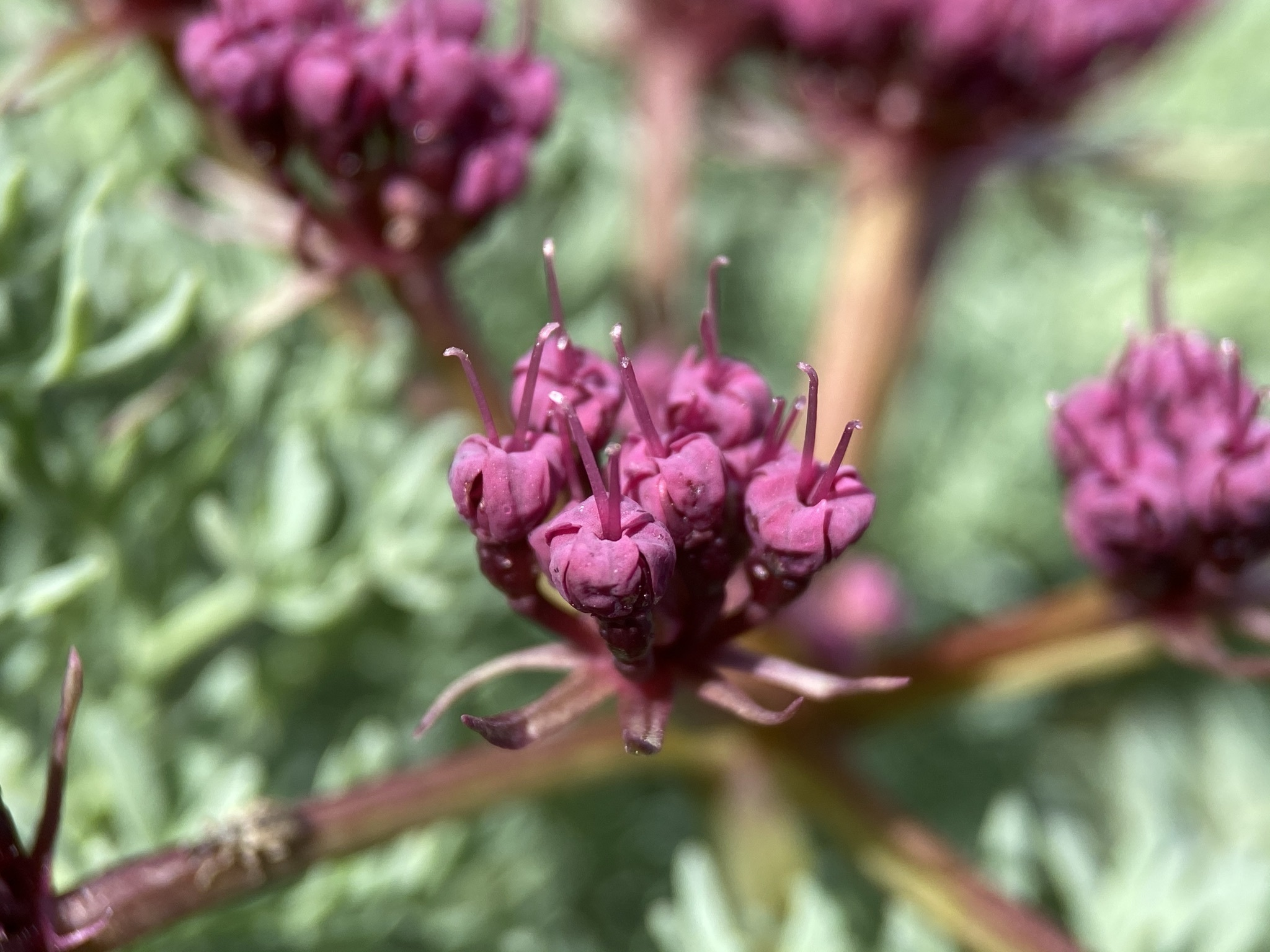
Flower closeup

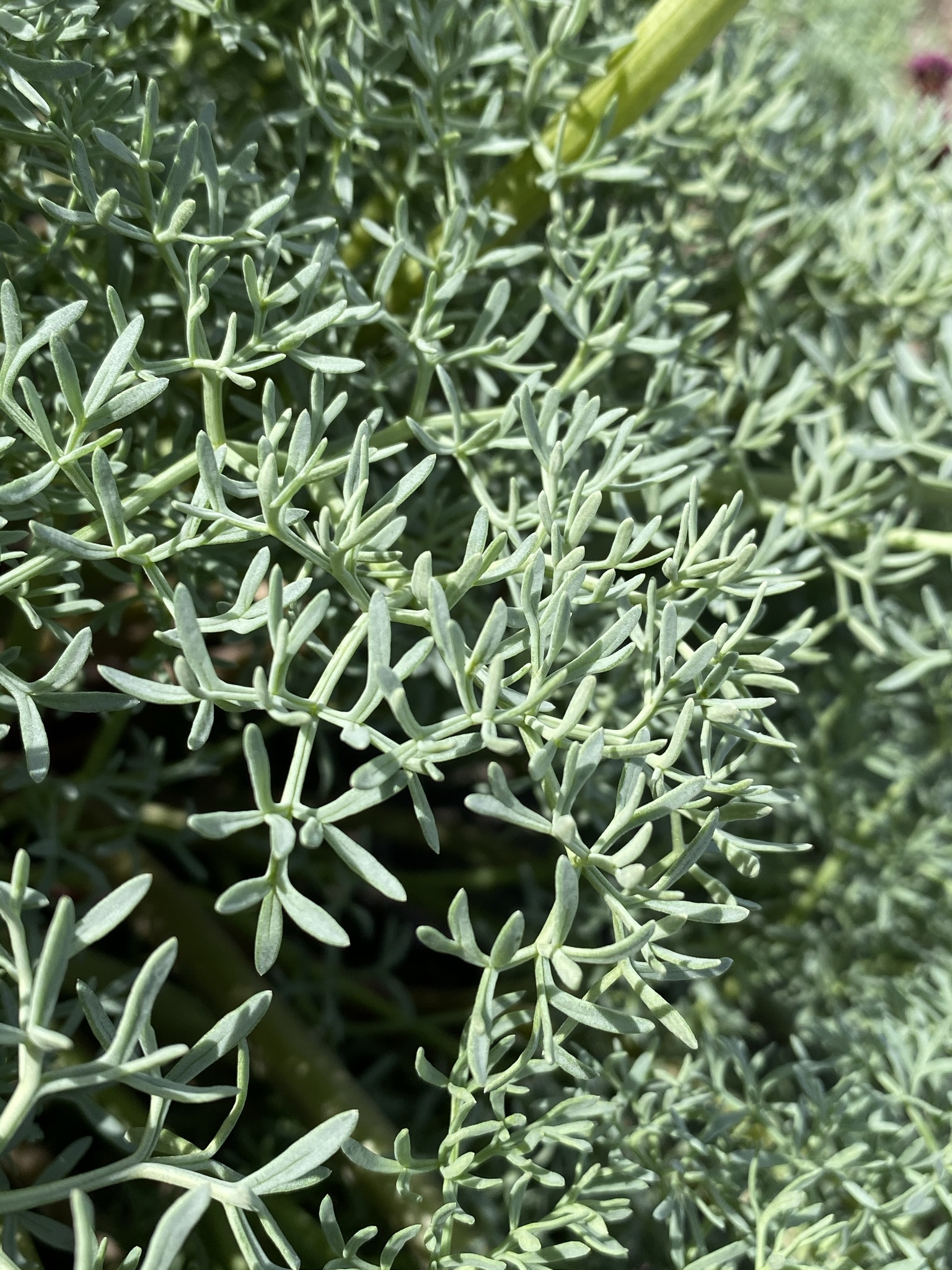
Foliage
