= Myrtle Lake (King County, Washington) =

Lake in Washingtion state, U.S.

- Location within Washington (state) Location within the United States
- Location: King County, Washington, United States
- Coordinates: 47.54921°N 121.38338°W
- Primary outflows: Dingford Creek
- Basin countries: United States
- Surface area: 14.4 acres (0.058 km^{2})
- Surface elevation: 3,779 ft (1,152 m)

Myrtle Lake is a freshwater lake located on the northern slope of Big Snow Mountain between Snoqualmie Lake and Chetwoot Lake, in King County, Washington. Self-issued Alpine Lake Wilderness permit required for transit within the Big Snow Mountain area. Because Myrtle Lake is at the heart of the Alpine Lakes Wilderness, the lake is a popular area for hiking, swimming, and fishing rainbow trout and coastal cutthroat trout.

The input for Myrtle Lake is from Little Myrtle Lake, less than a mile distance to the north. Big Snow Lake is also a short distance from Myrtle Lake, to the East while Little Bulger Ridge overshadows off the northwest shore of Myrtle Lake.

== Location ==
Myrtle lake is surrounded by alpine lakes north of Big Snow Mountain. Access is from Dingford Creek trail off Middle Fork Trail 1003 in the heart of the Middle Fork valley, past the open-air cabana at the Goldmeyer Hot Springs pools and past the junction to Hester Lake. The Dingford Creek trailhead starts off near 100-foot (30 m) tall Dingford Creek Falls, and Pumpkinseed Falls is a short distance upstream along the route on the north shore from a tributary fed by Pumpkinseed Lake.

== See also ==
- List of lakes of the Alpine Lakes Wilderness
