= Miller River =

- Location of the mouth of the Miller River in Washington Miller River (the United States)

Location
- Country: United States
- State: Washington

Physical characteristics
- Source: Confluence of the East and West Forks
  - location: North Cascades
  - coordinates: 47°40′31″N 121°23′15″W
- Mouth: Skykomish River
  - location: Miller River (Community)
  - coordinates: 47°43′8″N 121°23′38″W
- Discharge
  - location: near Miller River
  - average: 326 cu ft/s (9.2 m^{3}/s)
  - minimum: 18 cu ft/s (0.51 m^{3}/s)
  - maximum: 4,740 cu ft/s (134 m^{3}/s)

The Miller River is a river in King County, Washington. Named for 1890s prospector John Miller, it is a tributary of the Skykomish River, which it joins near the community of Miller River (which was, prior to World War I, known as Berlin). The Miller River is about 3.5 miles (5.6 km) long from the confluence of its main tributaries, the East Fork and West Fork. Miller River Campground is located just downriver from the confluence.

== West Fork ==
The West Fork Miller River begins at the ridge dividing it and Dream Lake, from where the Big Creek is a tributary to the Taylor River. It flows northeast from there, converging with the East Fork near the West Fork Campground. Its only officially named tributaries are Cleopatra and Coney Creeks. Cleopatra Creek drains a basin just north of the West Fork’s source while Coney Creek drains high-elevation Coney Lake. Just above its mouth, the West Fork drops over two small waterfalls, Borderline Falls then Immigration Falls. Access along the West Fork road is currently gated, washed out, and grown over (as of 2015) and there is no known plan for re-opening/repairing the road. Mechanized (Car, Bicycle, Helicopter, etc.) access is prohibited higher up on the roadbed due to Alpine Lakes Wilderness restrictions.

West Fork Tributaries

- Gouging Lake Outlet Stream
- Cleopatra Creek
- Coney Creek
- Francis Lake Outlet Stream

== East Fork ==
The 7-mile (11 km) long East Fork Miller River begins at the outlet of Lake Dorothy. Upon exiting the lake, the river drops over a headwall as it makes its way toward the bottom of Camp Robber Valley. Florence Falls occurs near the bottom of the headwall. Shortly after the falls, the river is joined by Camp Robber Creek, from the south, then Smith Creek from the west. Flowing north, the East Fork is joined by several unnamed tributaries. Great Falls Creek, which drains tiny Tumwater Lake, joins from the west.

East Fork Tributaries

- Camp Robber Creek
- Smith Creek
- Hinter Lake Outlet Stream
- Purvis Lake Outlet Stream
- Great Falls Creek

== Mainstream ==
From its source at the confluence of the East and West Forks, the Miller River flows north to its confluence with the Skykomish River near the community of Miller River. A major tributary is Happy Thought Creek, which drains small Cleveland Lake. Mohawk Creek flows joins the North Fork upstream of Happy Thought Creek and about 1/4 of a mile downstream of the West Fork.

Mainstream Tributaries

- Happy Thought Creek
- Mohawk Creek

== See also ==
- Miller River Waterfalls
- List of rivers in Washington
- Lake Dorothy
