= Snoqualmie Lake =

Lake in King County, Washington, United States

- Location within Washington (state) Location within the United States
- Location: King County, Washington, United States
- Coordinates: 47°34′1″N 121°24′42″W
- Primary inflows: Taylor River
- Primary outflows: Taylor River
- Basin countries: United States
- Surface elevation: 3,151 ft (960 m)

Snoqualmie Lake is a lake in King County, Washington. It is an expansion of the Taylor River and is located a short distance downstream from Deer Lake. It is the largest of the three lakes along the upper reaches of the Taylor.

The lake can be accessed by hiking up the Snoqualmie Lake Trail which starts 0.2 miles from the end of the Taylor River Trail. The trail is steep with several washouts. The trail first reaches the lake at the outlet and continues along its shore to the other end and eventually continues on to Deer Lake.

The Taylor River, after exiting the lake drops over a fairly large waterfall as it plunges down a headwall to the bottom of the valley. The trail passes a small portion of the falls.

== See also ==
- List of lakes in Washington
