= Lake Dorothy =

Lake in the Alpine Lakes Wilderness, Washington, United States

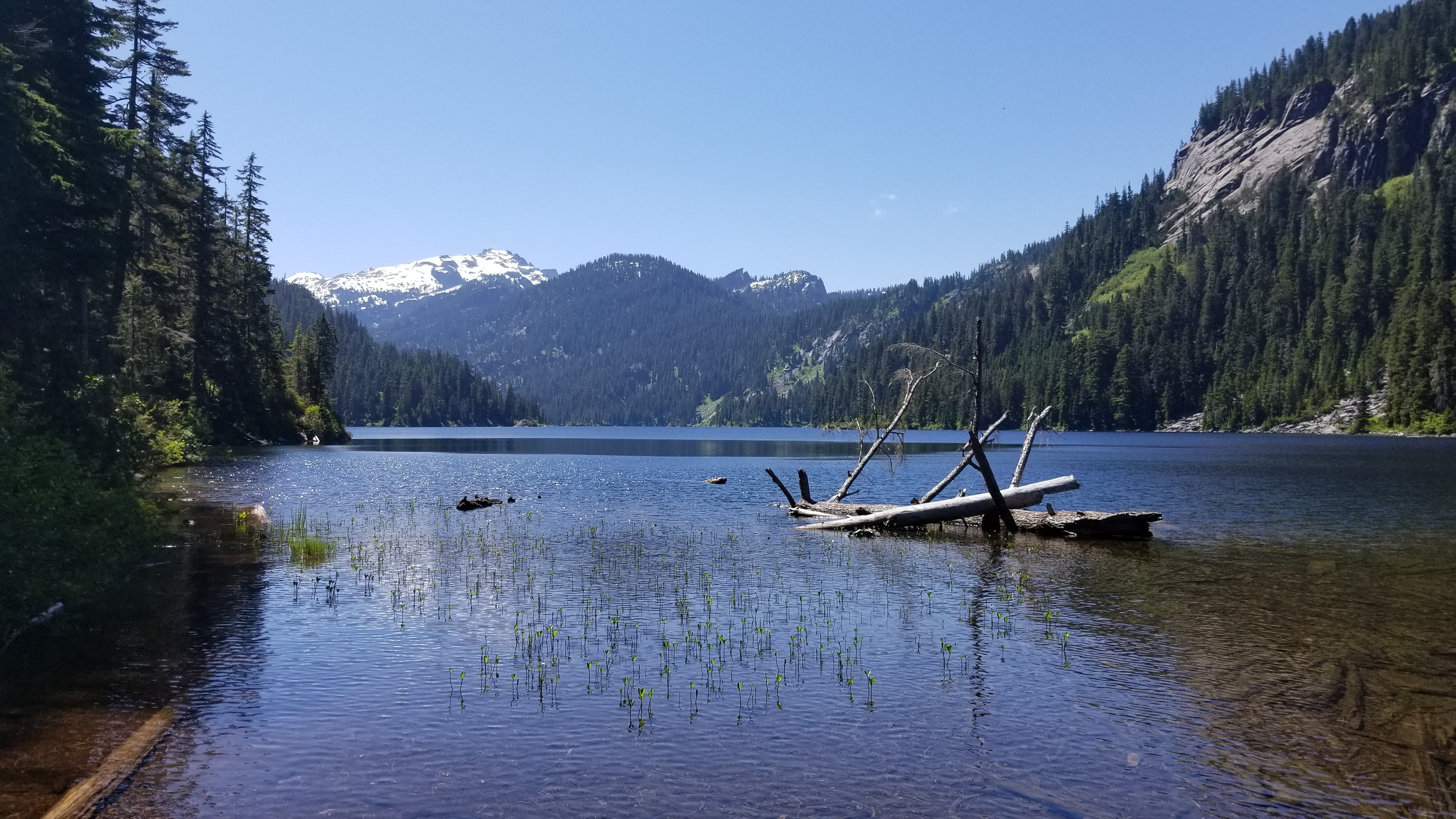

- Location within Washington (state) Location within the United States
- Location: King County, Washington
- Coordinates: 47°35′18″N 121°23′7″W
- Primary outflows: Miller River
- Basin countries: United States
- Surface area: 260.90 acres (105.58 ha)
- Surface elevation: 3,062 ft (933 m)
- Islands: 9

Lake Dorothy is a lake in King County, Washington. First labeled on Oliver P Anderson's "New Map of the County of King, State of Washington, 1894"; the name was bestowed by Anderson for his daughter Dorothy Louise Anderson (1893-1912), a member of Sigma Kappa sorority. It is one of the largest lakes in the area and is the source of the East Fork Miller River.

== Waterfalls ==
A number of waterfalls surround Lake Dorothy. Florence Falls (76 feet (23 m)) is located over a promontory a short distance downstream from the outlet. As Florence Falls reaches Camp Robber Creek a second waterfall is produced by a series of slides and cascades, 76 feet (23 m) Camp Robber Cascades.

== Access ==
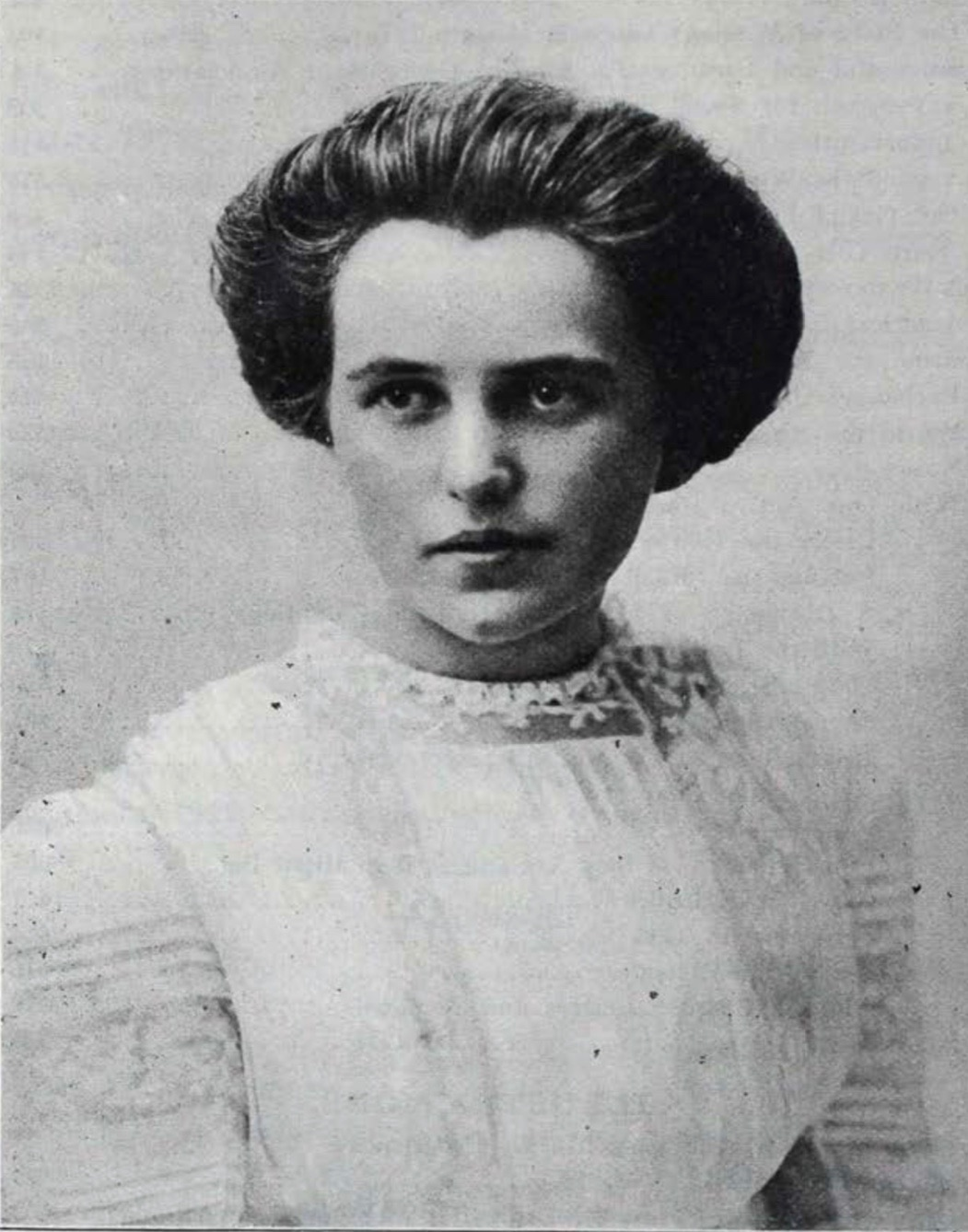
Dorothy Louise Anderson circa 1911 at age 18. Shortly after her birth, her father mapmaker Oliver P Anderson named Lake Dorothy after her in "New Map of the County of King, State of Washington, 1894."

The lake can be reached by the Dorothy Lake Trail which is about 2 miles to the lake. The trail continues another 2 miles along the lake’s shore to its south end. After that it continues on, climbing up from the lake and eventually climbing over a ridge before descending to Bear Lake and the Taylor River.

== See also ==
- List of lakes of the Alpine Lakes Wilderness
- Miller River Waterfalls
- Bear Lake
- Taylor River
