= Dog Mountain =

Mountain in Washington (state), United States

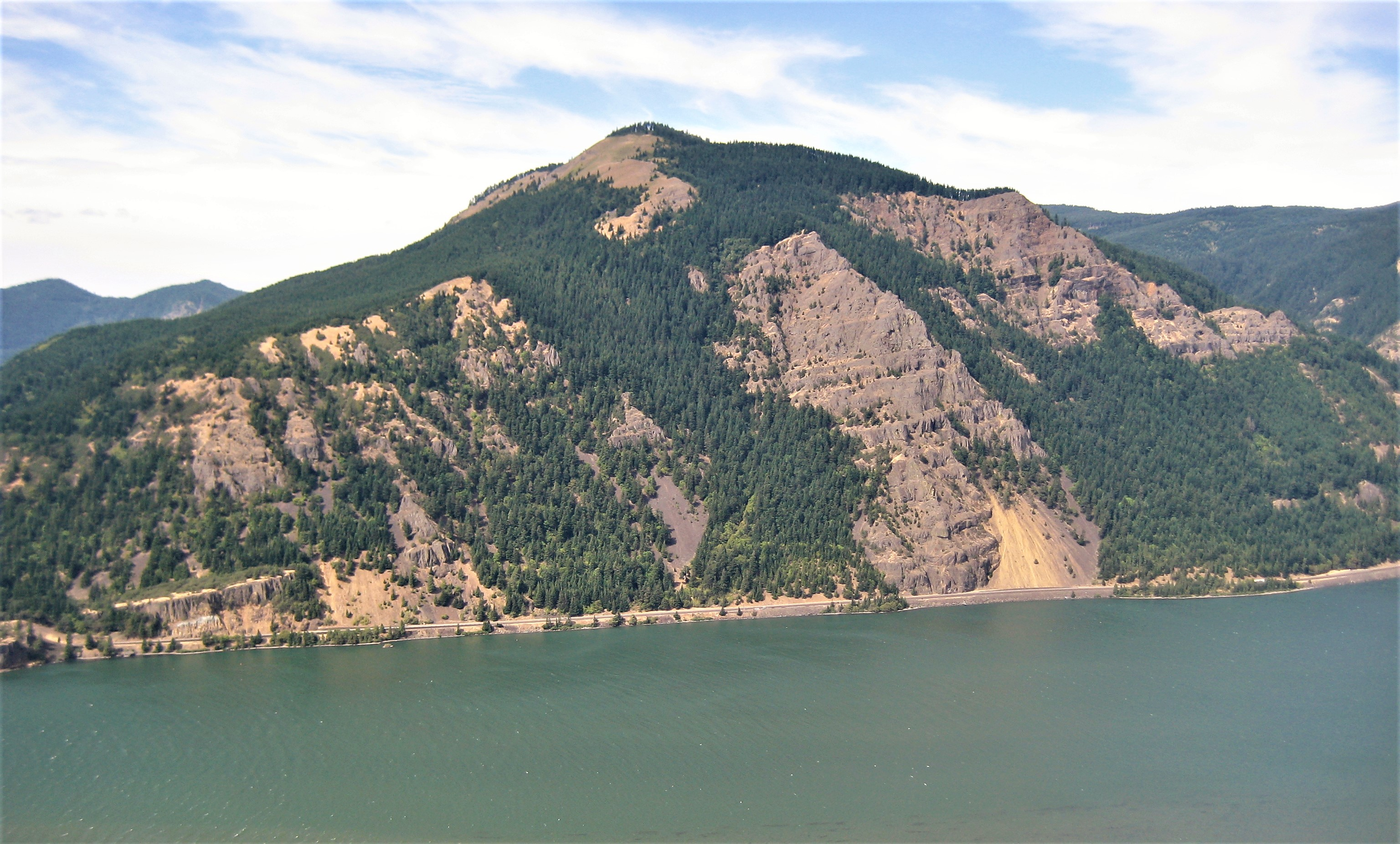
- South aspect of Dog Mountain

Highest point
- Elevation: 2,948 ft (899 m) NGVD 29
- Prominence: 1,148 ft (350 m)
- Coordinates: 45°43′01″N 121°42′04″W

Geography
- Location within Washington (state)
- Location: Skamania County, Washington, U.S.
- Parent range: Cascade Range
- Topo map: USGS Mount Defiance

Dog Mountain rises above the north side of the Columbia River Gorge in the U.S. state of Washington. The base of the mountain is in Skamania County along Washington State Route 14, about 9 miles (14 km) east of Stevenson and 53 miles (85 km) east of Vancouver. From its base at 150 feet (46 m), it climbs steeply to an elevation of 2,948 feet (899 m).

The mountain is the site of a popular hiking trail that begins on the north side of Route 14 at milepost 53. The 6-mile (9.7 km) trail winds through heavy forest to meadows and the site of a former fire lookout. After climbing steeply for about the first half mile (0.8 km), the trail splits into two forks that meet again at the summit. The lookout was built in 1931 and reconstructed in 1952 to watch for fires across the river in Oregon's Mount Hood National Forest. Outmoded by surveillance from roads and airplanes, the fire lookout was dismantled in 1967.

Attractions include views of the Columbia Gorge, Mount Hood, Mount St. Helens, Wind Mountain and wildflowers, especially in May. Flowering plants along the trail include chocolate lily, woodland star, fairy slipper, hookedspur violet, yellow fawn lily, balsamroot, and Columbia kittentails. Hazards include poison oak, rattlesnakes, scorpions, and steep slopes. The trail's difficulty caused one writer to describe it as "a grueling hike", while another said that Dog Mountain might better be called "Dogged Mountain or possibly Doggone Mountain", and recommended good boots for descending its steep pitches. A fatality occurred on the mountain in 2003, when a hiker lost her footing and fell 500 feet (150 m).

The trail is open year-round to hikers and to dogs on leashes, although in winter the upper portions may be snow covered at times. It cannot be used by people on horses or mountain bikes, and it is not suitable for wheelchairs. The permits fees, of 1-2 dollars, are to start the spring of 2018 to hike the trail and parking at the bottom requires a Northwest Forest Pass. The permit fee is waived if you ride the shuttle bus. Passes are available from a wide variety of vendors in Oregon and Washington.

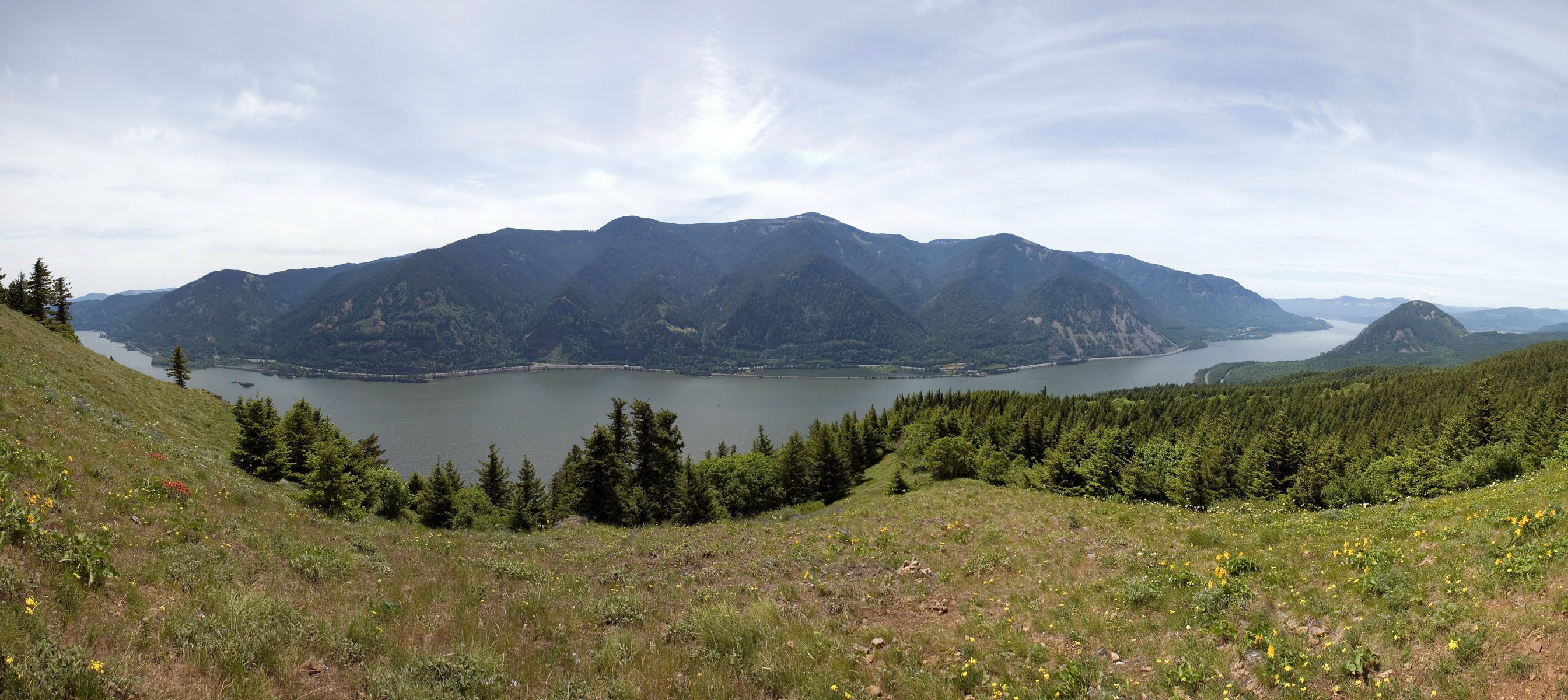
Columbia River Gorge from Dog Mountain
