= Otter Falls (Washington) =

Waterfall in Washington (state), United States

Coordinates: 47°35′15″N 121°28′02″W

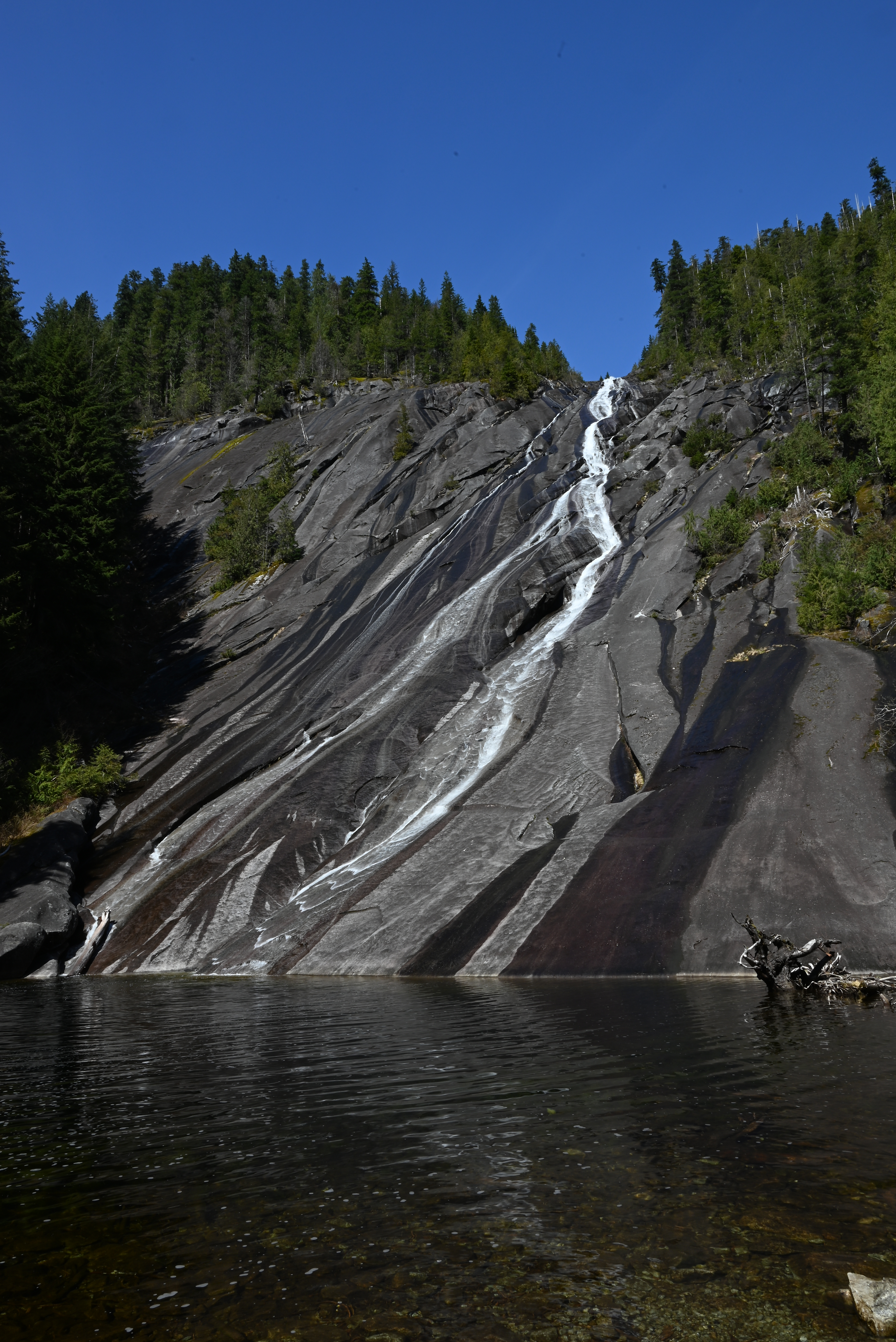
- View of the lower part of Otter Falls from the shore of Lipsy Lake
- Interactive map of Otter Falls
- Location: King County, Washington, US
- Type: Slide
- Total height: 1,600 ft (490 m)
- Number of drops: 2

Otter Falls (also Otter Slide, Otter Slide Falls or Otter Creek Falls) is a waterfall in King County, Washington; on the southern wall of Mount Anderson. It drops about 1,600 feet (490 m) in all, but due to the relatively moderate pitch of the mountainside, only about 1/3 of the total height can be seen from the ground. The drainage of Otter Creek, which feeds the falls, is fairly small, and consists mostly of granite which does not retain water. Therefore, the waterfall relies entirely on snowmelt to flow and often dries up by July.

Otter Creek is a tributary of the Taylor River that flows about 1 mile (1.6 km) off Mount Anderson, 1/2 of which is spent tumbling off these falls.
