= Taylor River (Washington) =

River in northwest Washington, United States

Coordinates: 47°32′46″N 121°32′2″W

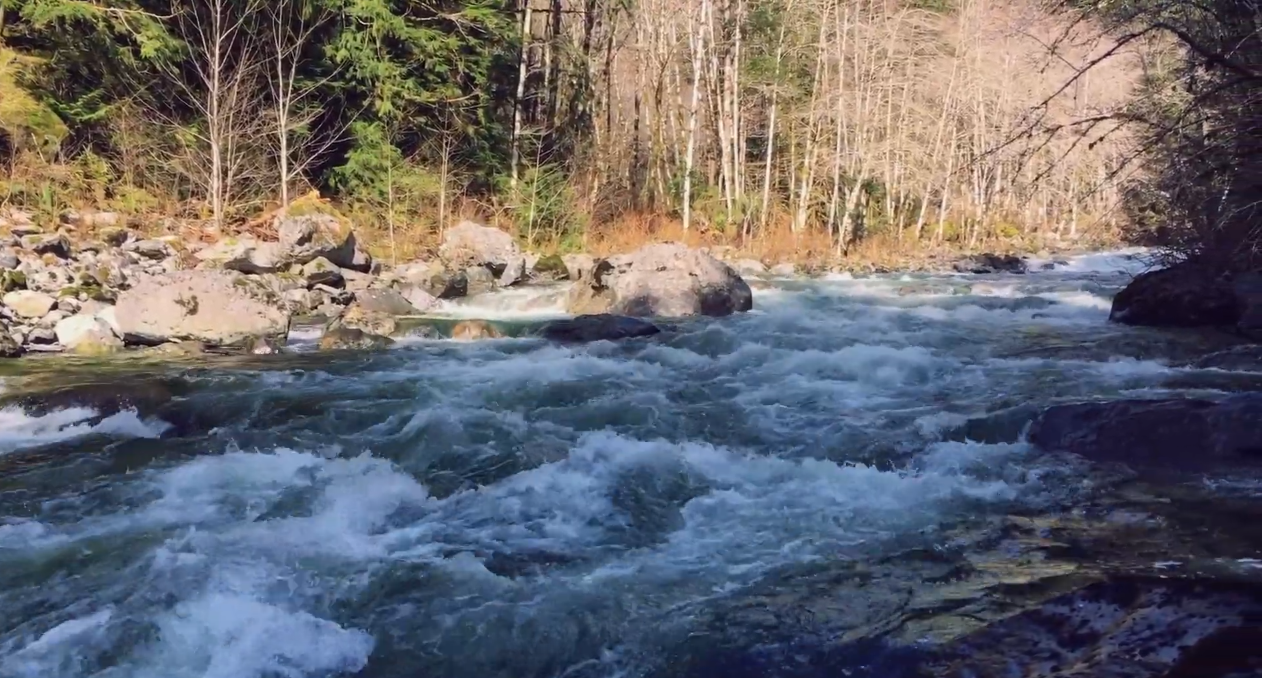
- Lower Taylor River from the Taylor River-Snoqualmie Lake trail

Location
- Country: United States
- State: Washington
- County: King County

Physical characteristics
- Source: Bear Lake
  - location: North Cascades
- Mouth: Middle Fork Snoqualmie River

The Taylor River is a river in King County in Washington.

== Course ==
The river starts at the outlet of Bear Lake. The river drops over a small waterfall before entering Deer Lake. After exiting Deer Lake, the river drops over another waterfall, this one much larger than the first, before entering the largest and best of the three lakes on the Taylor River, Snoqualmie Lake.

After exiting Snoqualmie Lake, the river drops over another good sized waterfall as it drops over the headwall below the lake. Near the bottom, the river receives the creek that drains Nordrum, Judy and Carole Lakes. The river then turns from west to northwest before soon turning west again. The river receives three large tributaries, Big Creek, Otter Creek and Marten Creek, all of which drop over large waterfalls before entering the river. After receiving Marten Creek, the river turns south towards its confluence with the Middle Fork Snoqualmie River. Shortly before entering the river, it receives one more major tributary, Quartz Creek.

== Hiking ==
There are several hiking trails in the area. The main and most popular one is the Taylor River Trail, which is an old road that ends near the base of the headwall below Snoqualmie Lake. It begins before a bridge over the river just upstream from the mouth of Quartz Creek. The trail follows the river relatively closely, crossing Marten and Big Creeks on bridges that have views of both creeks’ respective waterfalls (Otter Creek is also crossed, but there is no bridge and no falls are visible from the crossing). The trail ends 1.2 miles after the Big Creek Bridge.

The unmarked and rather rough trail to Marten Creek is found branching off the Taylor River Trail shortly before the Marten Creek Bridge.

Shortly after crossing Otter Creek, a short side trail branches off the Taylor River Trail. That path leads Lipsy Lake and the scenic slides of Otter Falls, which drop directly into the small lake.

The Dream Lake Trail branches off the Taylor River Trail shortly after the Big Creek Bridge. The trail follows the creek steeply up to the lake and is all but non-existent in some areas.

At the end of the Taylor River Trail is the start of the difficult Nordrum Lake Trail, a rough route that leads to remote Nordrum Lake and also provides access to Carole and Judy Lakes, to nearby back-country lakes.

== See also ==
- List of rivers in Washington
