= McLeod Creek =

Stream in Summit County, Utah, US

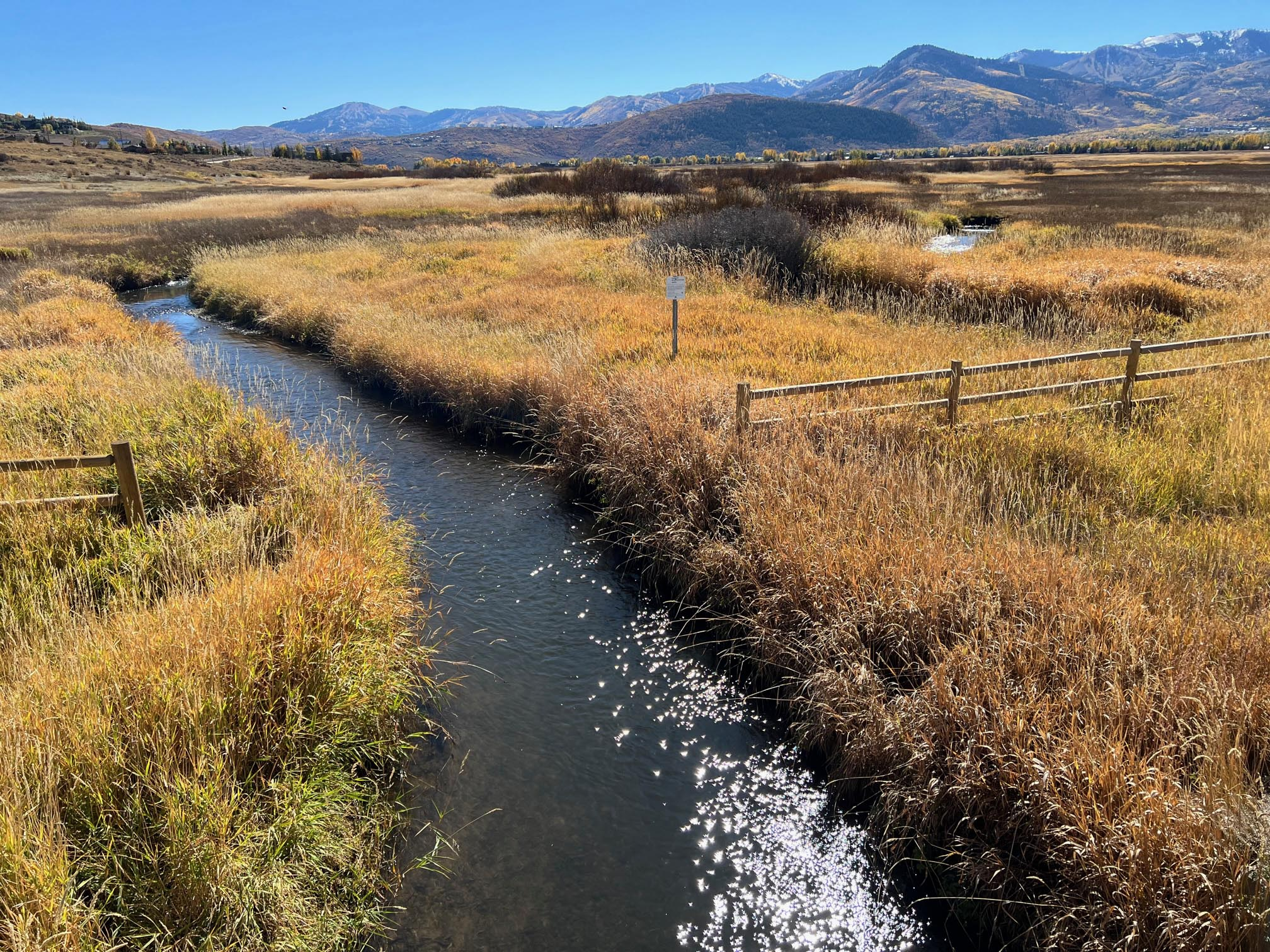
- View of McLeod Creek, looking south over Swaner Preserve from Highland Drive, Snyderville, Utah in October 2023

- Location of mouth

Location
- Country: United States
- State: Utah
- Region: Summit County, Utah

Physical characteristics
- Source: Eastern slope of the Wasatch Range
  - location: 1.3 miles (2.1 km) southwest of Park City, Utah
  - coordinates: 40°37′44″N 111°31′00″W
  - elevation: 8,224 ft (2,507 m)
- Mouth: Confluence with Kimball Creek, the beginning of East Canyon Creek
  - location: 1.4 miles (2.3 km) east of Kimball Junction, Utah
  - coordinates: 40°43′26″N 111°31′07″W
  - elevation: 6,300 ft (1,900 m)
- Length: 9.0 mi (14.5 km)

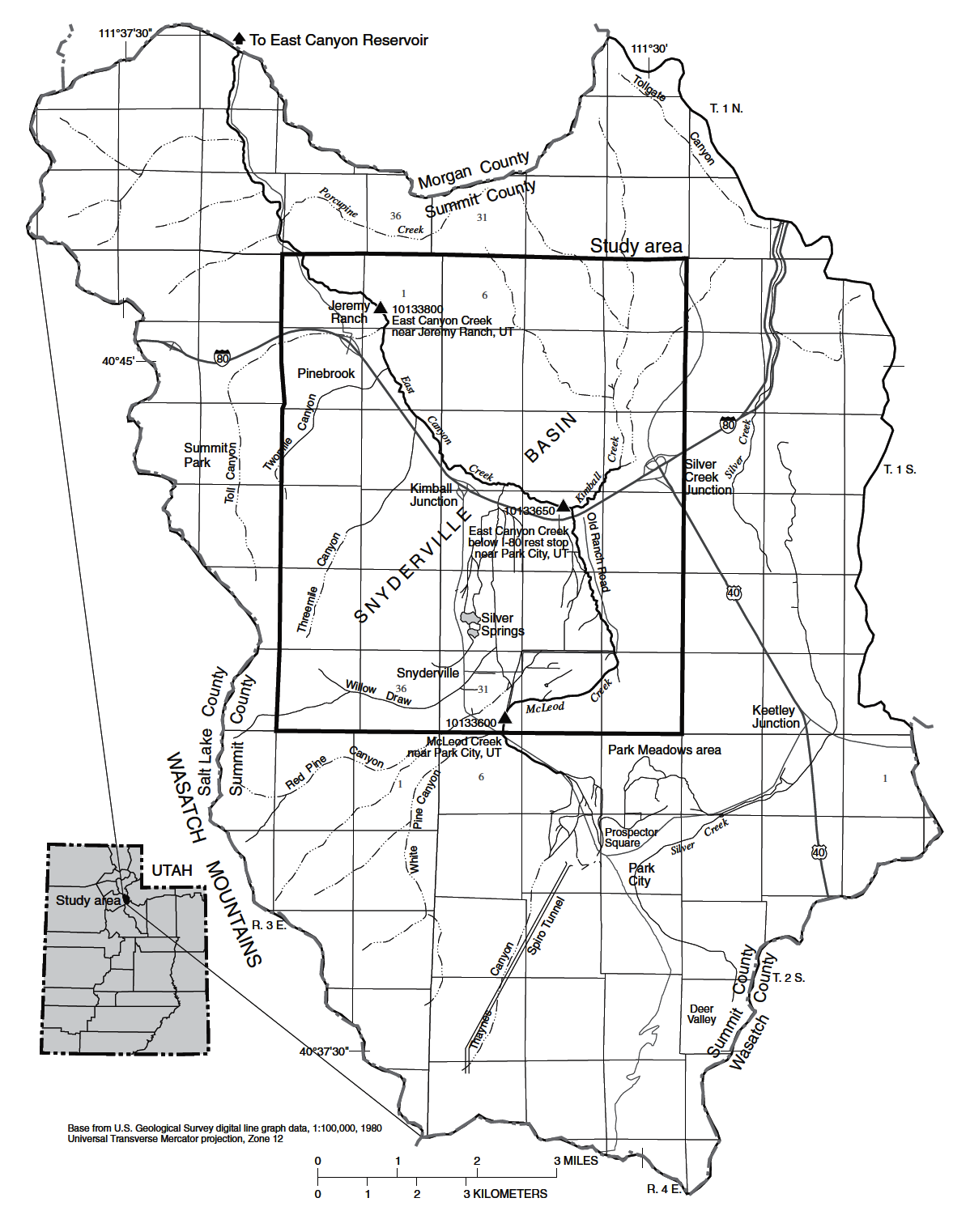
USGS Map of Kimball Creek and McLeod Creek confluence, the sources of East Canyon Creek

McLeod Creek is a 9.0-mile-long (14.5 km) northwards-flowing stream that begins 1.3 miles (2.1 km) southwest of Park City, Utah on the east side of the summit of the Wasatch Range. It is one of the upper reaches of the East Canyon Creek watershed in Summit County, Utah, which flows to the Weber River and ultimately the Great Salt Lake.

== History ==
McLeod Creek is probably named for long-time Park City miner and prospector John McLeod, who resided in "The Park" for about 30 years and died at age 67 in 1911.

== Watershed and course ==
McLeod Creek begins on the slopes of the Park City Mountain Resort between Crescent Ridge and Treasure Hill and flows northeast through Park City, Utah. As the two creeks pass north through Park City there is a low topographic divide with McLeod Creek to the west and Silver Creek to the east. Silver Creek is joined by a tributary from Thaynes Canyon in the city then proceeds north, whereas Silver Creek turns east to eventually join the upper Weber River at Wanship, Utah. As Silver Creek passes north around the west side of Quarry Mountain, it passes beneath Utah State Route 224, the location of many vehicle-wildlife collisions. SR224 has been identified as fifth-worst highway in the state for with 2.97 vehicle-wildlife collisions per mile.

Silver Creek then passes further north through the Snyderville Basin east of Snyderville, Utah, and then through Parleys Park towards Interstate 80. Shortly after crossing north beneath I80, it is joined on the right by a smaller stream named Kimball Creek, and this confluence forms the source of East Canyon Creek, a tributary of the Weber River, and ultimately, the Great Salt Lake. Note the Geographic Names Information System (GNIS) likely needs to be corrected to be consistent with the U.S. Geological Survey report and map.

== Ecology and conservation ==
From the mid-1800s through the 1970s, the McLeod Creek and nearby Silver Creek watersheds about Park City were mined extensively for silver and lead. Tailing wastes from these mines continue to pollute Silver Creek, and to a less extent, McLeod and Kimball Creeks. However, lead and zinc concentrations in McLeod Creek may still pose a risk to aquatic life.

As McLeod Creek passes between Iron Mountain and Quarry Mountain near the White Barn at McPolin Farmstead, it crosses Highway 224. There have been many deer, elk, and moose collisions at this location, highlighting its importance as a critical wildlife corridor. The organization Save People Save Wildlife has argued for better fencing and a crossing structure to protect both vehicle passengers and wildlife at this location.

Bonneville cutthroat trout (Oncorhynchus clarkii utah) is a Utah Sensitive subspecies of cutthroat trout and was the native trout species in the East Canyon Creek watershed, however it is thought to be extirpated due to decreased flows, increased nutrient input, degradation to water and habitat quality, and depredation by non-native introduced brown trout (Salmo trutta) and possibly by hybridization with non-native introduced rainbow trout (Oncorhynchus mykiss).

== See also ==
- East Canyon Creek
- Weber River
