= Hardscrabble Creek =

Hardscrabble Creek may refer to:

== Streams in the United States ==
- Hardscrabble Creek, a tributary of Fossil Creek, Camp Verde, Arizona
- Hardscrabble Creek, a tributary of Smith River, California, a National Wild and Scenic River
- Hardscrabble Creek (Arkansas River), a stream in Custer and Fremont Counties, Colorado
- Hardscrabble Creek, a tributary of Elk Creek (Umpqua River tributary), Oregon
- Hardscrabble Creek, a tributary of East Canyon Creek, Utah
- Hardscrabble Creek, near Gold Lake (King County, Washington)

== Other uses ==
- "Hardscrabble Creek", a song by Michael Martin Murphey from the 2013 album Red River Drifter

== See also ==
- "Letter from Hardscrabble Creek", a syndicated column by Chas S. Clifton
