= Cuberant Lake =

Lake in the state of Utah, United States

- Cuberant Lake #1
- Location within Utah
- Location: Summit County, Utah
- Group: x
- Coordinates: 40°44′21″N 110°54′52″W
- Type: lake
- Basin countries: United States
- Surface elevation: 10,427 ft (3,178 m)

Cuberant Lake (or Cuberant Lake #1) is a lake in the Uinta Mountains in Summit County, Utah, United States. It is also within the Kamas Ranger District of the Uinta-Wasatch-Cache National Forest and about 3,500 feet (1,100 m) northwest of Mount Marsell (elevation: 11,340 feet [3,460 m]). The lake has an elevation of 10,426 feet (3,178 m).

Cuberant is a word derived from the Ute language meaning "long". The (main) lake is substantially larger than the other six lakes in the Cuberant Lakes Basin (the other six are unnamed and are simply referred to as "Cuberant Lake #2", "Cuberrant Lake #3", etc.) The Cuberant Lakes Basin drains by way of fairly short stream (about 4,500 feet [1,400 m]) that flows west-southwest, while descending nearly 1,000 feet (300 m), and empties into the Weber River. As the basin is surrounded by steep inclines and declines, the only reasonable access to the lake and the basin is by way of a trail (#080) that branches off the Lofty Lake Trail and circles around the west side of Mount Marsell. (The Lofty Lake Trail [#158] begins at the Mirror Lake Scenic Byway [SR-150] and heads northwest through Reid's Meadow before the two trails split.)
