= Disappearance of Garrett Bardsley =

Unsolved 2004 disappearance of an American boy

Garrett Bardsley
- Born: July 24, 1992; Utah, U.S.
- Disappeared: August 20, 2004 (aged 12); Cuberant Lake, Utah, U.S.
- Status: Missing for 22 years, 2 months and 29 days
- Education: Spanish Fork Middle School
- Occupation: Student
- Height: 5 ft 0 in (152 cm)
- Parent: Kevin Bardsley (father) Deborah Bardsley (mother)

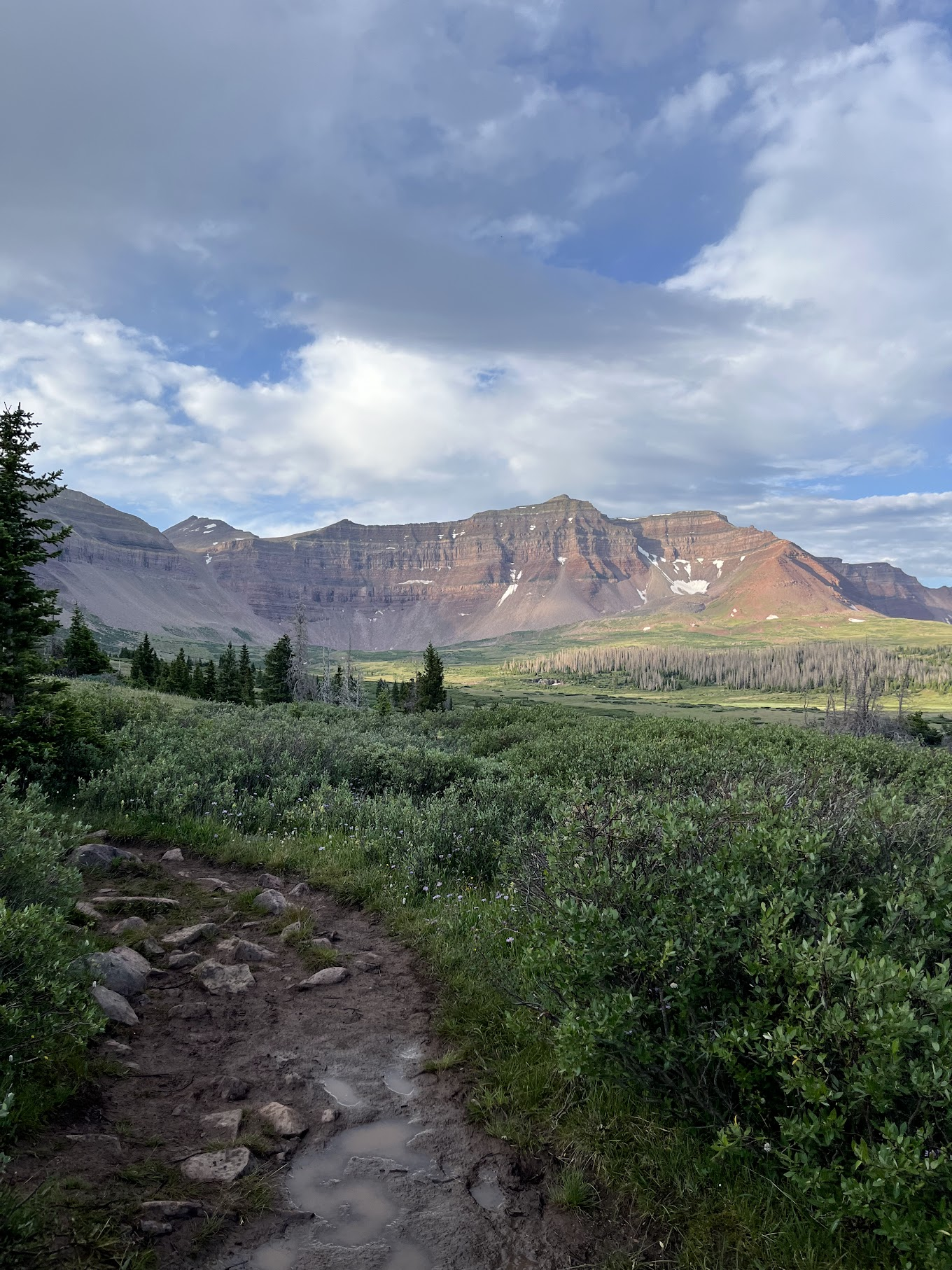
Henrys Fork (Green River tributary) Trail July 2024, Uinta Mountains north east near to where Bardsley last seen

Locations
1 Cuberant Lake
Locations
1 Cuberant Lake in Summit County, Utah

Garrett Alexander Bardsley (born July 24, 1992) is an American boy who disappeared on August 20, 2004, during a camping trip with his father and fellow Boy Scouts near Cuberant Lake in the Uinta Mountains of Utah. Despite an intensive search operation involving hundreds of volunteers, dogs, and aerial support, Garrett was never found. His case remains unsolved.

== Background ==
Garrett Bardsley was born in 1992 in Utah, the youngest of four children. He was a student at Spanish Fork Middle School and a member of the Boy Scouts of America. In August 2004, he accompanied his father, Kevin Bardsley, and a group of Boy Scouts on a backpacking trip to the Uinta Mountains, a popular outdoor recreation area in northeastern Utah.

== Disappearance ==
On the morning of August 20, 2004, Garrett was fishing with his father near the edge of an unnamed lake in the Cuberant Lakes Basin when he accidentally got his shoes and socks wet. He reportedly left the group to walk a short distance of approximately 150 yards back to the family’s campsite to change into dry socks and shoes. It was around 8:00 a.m., and visibility was clear. His father watched him for part of the walk but briefly turned his attention to the lake. When he looked back, Garrett was gone.

Initial attempts to locate Garrett by family and nearby campers were unsuccessful. There were no signs of struggle or injury, and the area had minimal undergrowth, making it difficult to understand how he could have simply vanished.

== Investigation and search efforts ==
A massive search operation was launched within hours, coordinated by local law enforcement, volunteers, and trained search and rescue teams. Over 1,400 volunteers participated in the effort over several days. Helicopters, dogs, and thermal imaging were all employed to search the densely wooded and rugged terrain.

Despite the scale of the operation, no trace of Garrett was ever found: no clothing, footprints, nor personal belongings.

During the first couple of days of the search, a damp Nike sock, similar to the kind Garrett was wearing when he disappeared, was found balled up in a boulder field about half a mile from where Garrett was last seen. Later that day, a searcher claimed the sock as his own, thinking he must have dropped it there, but no further evidence suggested whether the sock belonged to Garrett or the searcher. Despite this finding, no other items were ever found again and there was no evidence that he ever even reached his family's campsite.

The search was hampered by difficult terrain and inconsistent weather, with rain and snow during the first few days after his disappearance. After several weeks, the formal search was scaled back, though Garrett’s parents and volunteers continued periodic efforts up to August 2005.

In 2009, video evidence of a possible sighting of Bardsley in Elko, Nevada, was reviewed by Detective Ron Bridge of the Summit County Sheriff’s Office, who reported that "It’s not 100-percent clear, but the possibility of it being Garrett Bardsley is very, very slim.”

In 2025, Bardsley's father stated, "We don't know what happened to Garrett. It's been 21 years, and we haven't found anything,” adding that "the wilderness ... is not a place that you should go by yourself."

== Theories ==
Investigators initially believed that Garrett may have become disoriented and succumbed to the elements, possibly falling into a crevice or becoming hidden in underbrush. However, the complete absence of physical evidence has led to speculation about other possible explanations, including animal predation or abduction.

== Aftermath ==
Garrett's disappearance deeply impacted his family and the broader Utah community. His father, Kevin Bardsley, later founded the Garrett Bardsley Foundation, a nonprofit organization dedicated to helping find missing persons and improving search-and-rescue efforts.

== See also ==
- List of people who disappeared mysteriously (2000–present)
