= Dead Ox Canyon (Utah) =

Canyon in Utah, United States

Coordinates: 37.6863703°N 112.2023919°W

Dead Ox Canyon is a canyon in southern Morgan County, Utah, United States.

== Description ==
The canyon is located in the Wasatch Range. It begins just north of the Dead Ox summit and then runs roughly east for about 3 miles (4.8 km) until it reaches its mouth in East Canyon, within the East Canyon State Park and just south of the East Canyon Reservoir.

Dead Ox Canyon received its name from an incident when oxen escaped their owners and were found dead.

== See also ==
- List of canyons and gorges in Utah
