= Kimball Creek (Summit County, Utah) =

Stream in Summit County, Utah, US

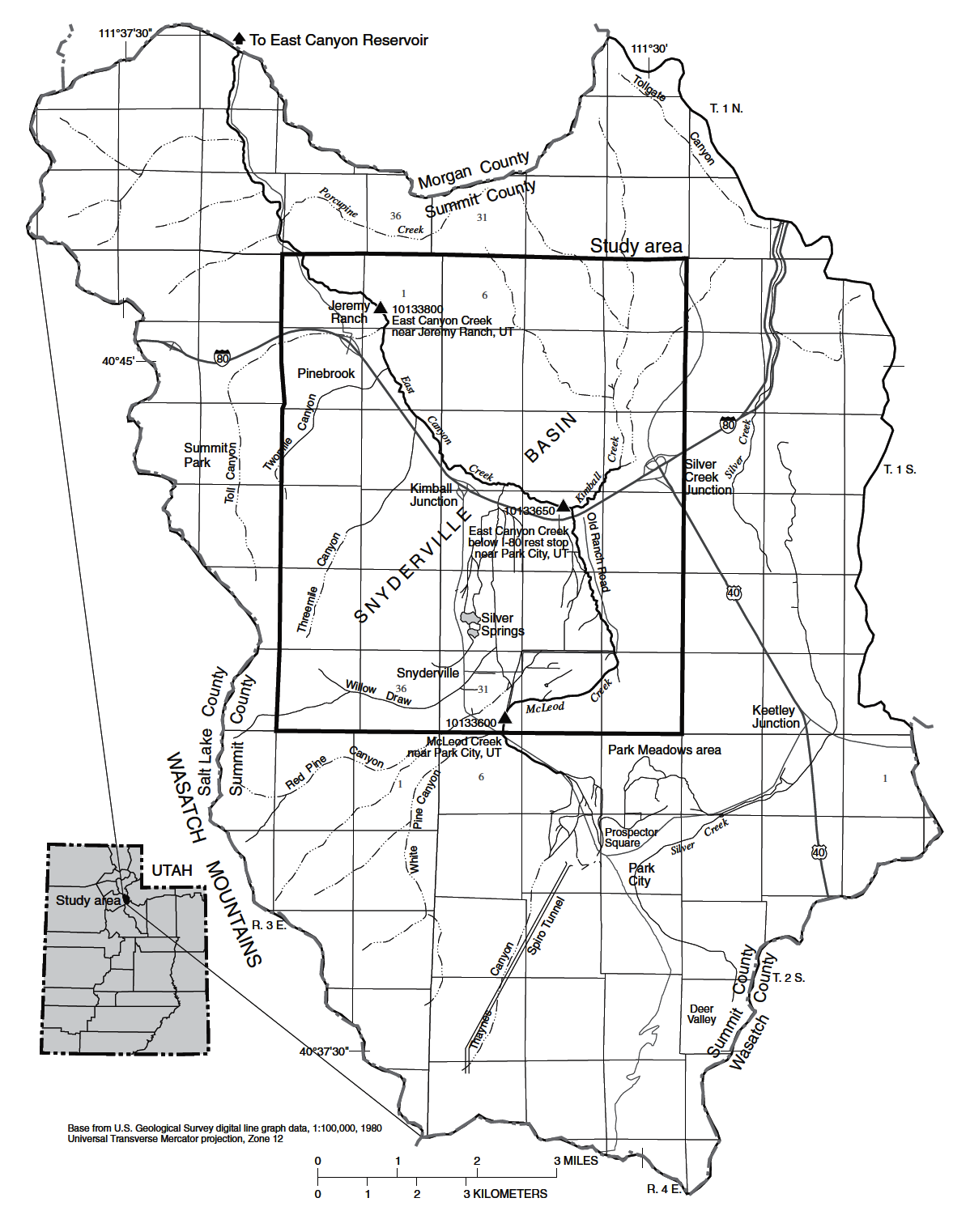
- Map showing the confluence of Kimball Creek and McLeod Creek, the source of East Canyon Creek, just north of Interstate 80, near Park City, Utah.

- Location of mouth

Location
- Country: United States
- State: Utah
- Region: Summit County, Utah

Physical characteristics
- Source: Eastern slope of the Wasatch Range
  - location: 6 miles (9.7 km) north of Park City, Utah
  - coordinates: 40°44′08″N 111°30′03″W
  - elevation: 6,411 ft (1,954 m)
- Mouth: Confluence with McLeod Creek, the beginning of East Canyon Creek
  - location: 1.4 miles (2.3 km) east of Kimball Junction, Utah
  - coordinates: 40°43′26″N 111°31′07″W
  - elevation: 6,300 ft (1,900 m)
- Length: 1.9 mi (3.1 km)

Kimball Creek is a 1.9-mile-long (3.1 km) west-flowing stream that begins 5.7 miles (9.2 km) north of Park City, Utah, on the east side of the summit of the Wasatch Range. It is one of the upper reaches of the East Canyon Creek watershed in Summit County, Utah, which in turn is a tributary to the Weber River, and ultimately to the Great Salt Lake.

== History ==
Kimball Creek is named for a rancher named George Kimball. It passes through Kimball Stage Stop, a ranch stage stop owned by William H. Kimball, and where he built a rock stage structure that still stands. From there Kimball Creek flows 1.5 miles (2.4 km) west through Kimball Junction.

== Watershed and course ==
Kimball Creek begins just west of Silver Creek Road (the northerly extension of north Highway 40, and just north of Interstate 80. Shortly after its source, it is joined on the left by a larger stream named McLeod Creek, and this confluence forms the source of East Canyon Creek, a tributary of the Weber River, and ultimately, the Great Salt Lake. Note the Geographic Names Information System (GNIS) likely needs to be corrected to be consistent with the U.S. Geological Survey report and map.

== Ecology and conservation ==
Bonneville cutthroat trout (Oncorhynchus clarkii utah) is a Utah Sensitive subspecies of cutthroat trout and was the native trout species in the East Canyon Creek watershed, however it is thought to be extirpated due to decreased flows, increased nutrient input, degradation to water and habitat quality, and depredation by non-native introduced brown trout (Salmo trutta) and possibly by hybridization with non-native introduced rainbow trout (Oncorhynchus mykiss).

== See also ==
- East Canyon Creek
- Weber River
