= Notch Mountain (Utah) =

Mountain in Summit County, Utah, United States

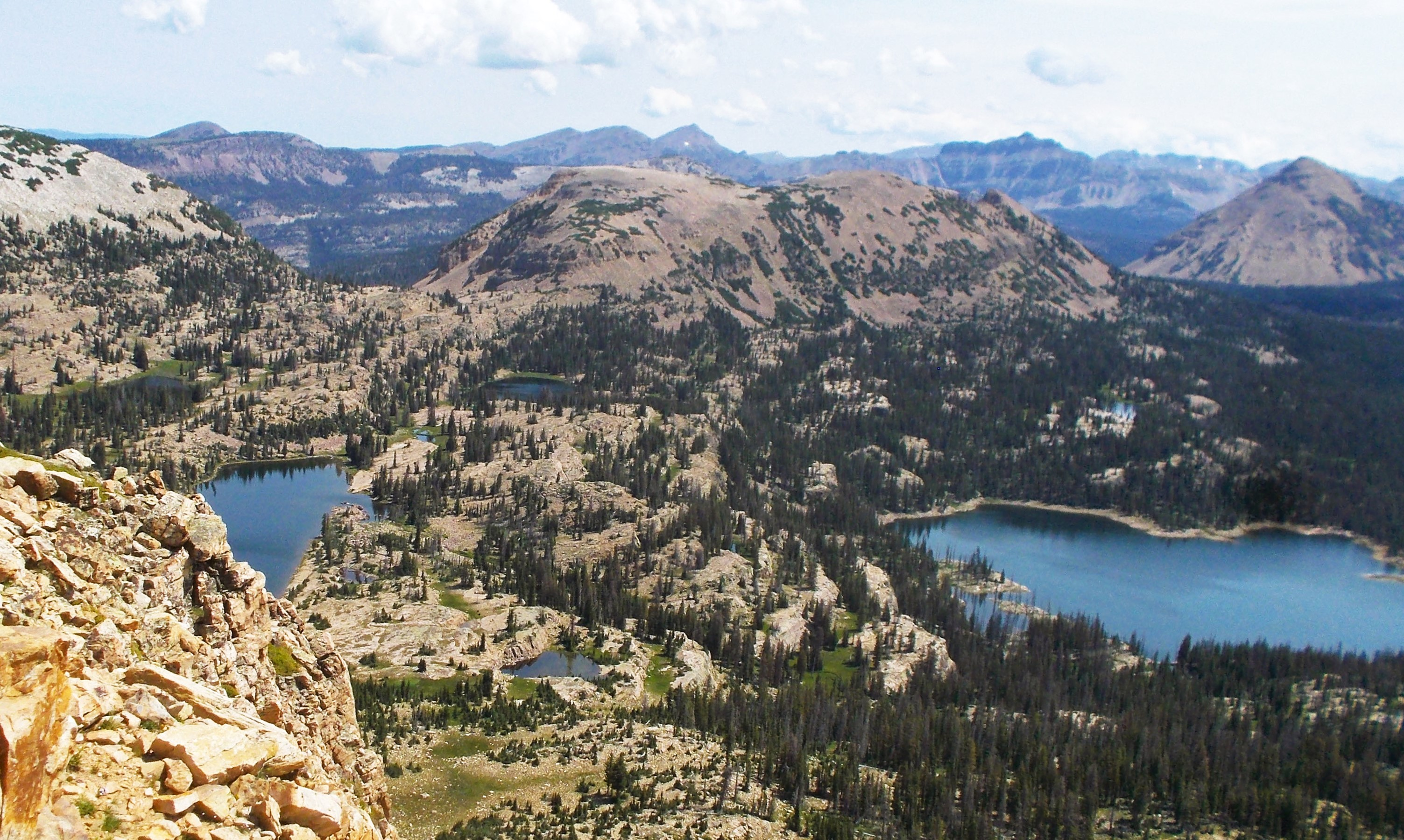
- Southwest aspect, from Mount Watson

Highest point
- Elevation: 11,263 ft (3,433 m)
- Prominence: 803 ft (245 m)
- Parent peak: Mount Watson (11,521 ft)
- Isolation: 1.69 mi (2.72 km)
- Coordinates: 40°42′24″N 110°56′53″W

Geography
- Location within Utah Location within the United States
- Country: United States of America
- State: Utah
- County: Summit
- Parent range: Uinta Mountains; Rocky Mountains
- Topo map: USGS Mirror Lake

Geology
- Rock age: Late Precambrian
- Rock type: Quartz arenite

Climbing
- Easiest route: class 2+ scrambling

Notch Mountain is an 11,263-foot-elevation (3,433-meter) mountain summit in Summit County, Utah, United States.

== Description ==
Notch Mountain is located 50 miles (80 km) east of Salt Lake City in the Uinta-Wasatch-Cache National Forest. It is situated in the western Uinta Mountains which are a subrange of the Rocky Mountains. Precipitation runoff from this mountain drains north into headwaters of the Weber River and south into headwaters of the Provo River. Topographic relief is significant as the summit rises 1,100 feet (335 meters) above Wall Lake (source of the Provo River) in 0.75 mile (1.2 km). Access to the mountain is via the Mirror Lake Highway and hiking the 10-mile Notch Mountain Trail which passes through "The Notch", but does not lead to the summit. The Notch is a 10,621-foot-elevation gap between the 11,263-ft east peak and the 11,258-ft west peak. The mountain's descriptive toponym was officially adopted in 1932 by the U.S. Board on Geographic Names.

== Geology ==
Notch Mountain is composed of metasedimentary rock of the Mount Watson Formation. Fluvial sediment processes deposited a sequence of nearly white quartz arenite and subarkose interbedded with minor amounts of pale-red arkosic arenite and grayish-green shale during the Late Precambrian. The Uintas were uplifted during the Laramide orogeny about 70 to 50 million years ago. Numerous glacial cycles during the Quaternary Period sculpted the mountain and scoured the surrounding land forming many depressions that are now lakes.

== Climate ==
Based on the Köppen climate classification, Notch Mountain is located in a subarctic climate zone with cold snowy winters and mild summers. Tundra climate characterizes the summit and highest slopes. The months of July through early October offer the most favorable weather to visit the mountain.

== See also ==
- Geology of the Uinta Mountains
- List of mountains in Utah

== Gallery ==
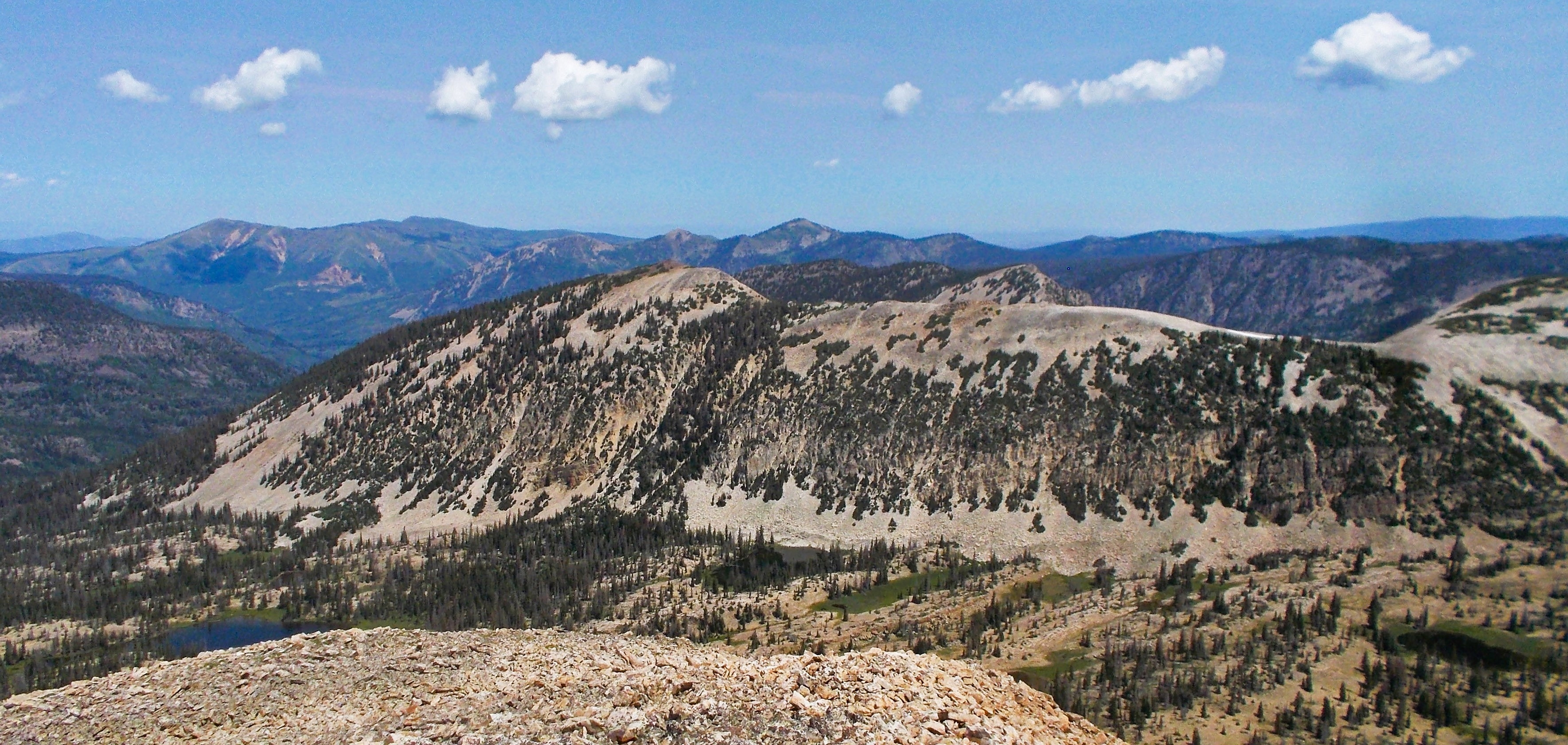
West Notch Mountain (11,258 ft)

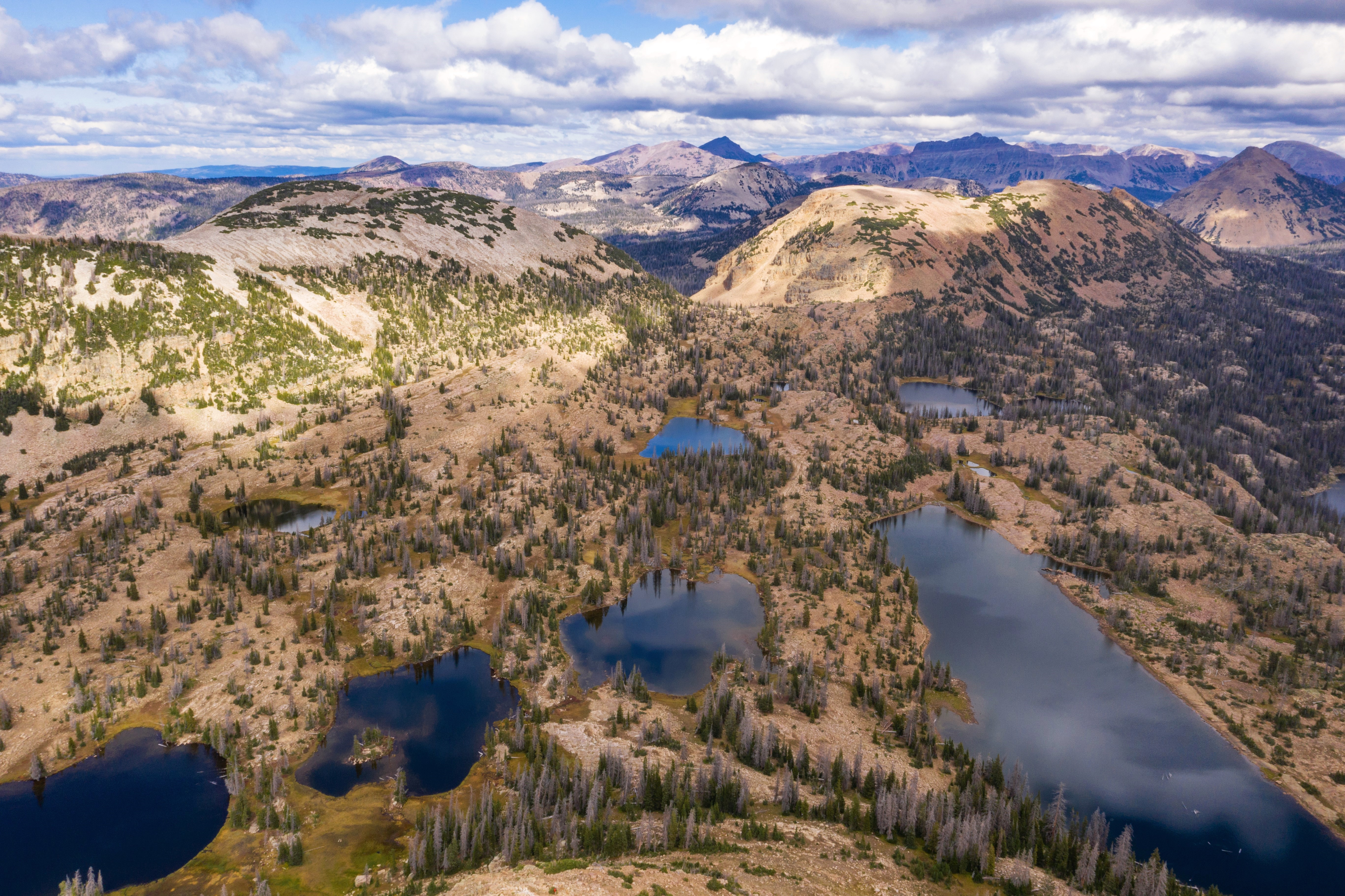
View from Mount Watson looking northeast toward Notch Mountain
