= Malachite Peak =

Mountain in Washington (state), United States

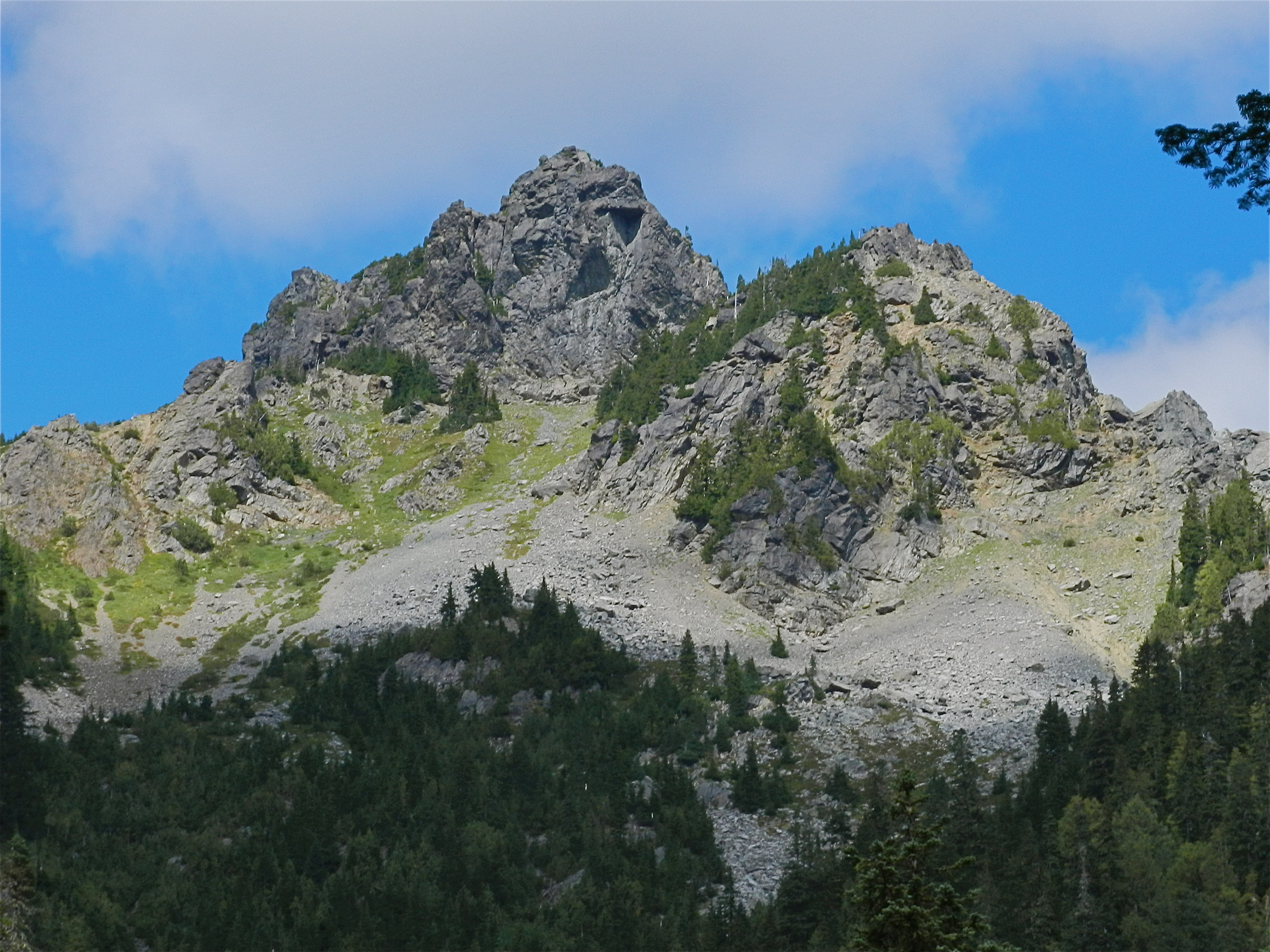
- Malachite Peak

Highest point
- Elevation: 6,261 ft (1,908 m)
- Prominence: 1,261 ft (384 m)
- Parent peak: Camp Robber Peak (6,286 ft)
- Isolation: 3.66 mi (5.89 km)
- Coordinates: 47°37′26″N 121°20′28″W

Geography
- Location within Washington (state) Location within the United States
- Country: United States
- State: Washington
- County: King
- Protected area: Alpine Lakes Wilderness
- Parent range: Cascade Range
- Topo map: USGS Big Snow Mountain

Climbing
- First ascent: 1937
- Easiest route: class 3 scrambling

Malachite Peak is a 6,261-foot (1,908-metre) mountain summit located 5.5 mi (8.9 km) south of Skykomish, in eastern King County of Washington state. It's part of the Cascade Range, and is situated one mile north of Lake Malachite in the Alpine Lakes Wilderness, on land managed by Mount Baker-Snoqualmie National Forest. Precipitation runoff from the mountain drains into tributaries of the Skykomish River. The nearest higher neighbor is Camp Robber Peak, 3.66 mi (5.89 km) to the south. The first ascent of this peak may have been in 1937 by a team from the United States Geological Survey. The USGS named the peak about 1975 based on a triangulation station marked as "Malachite".

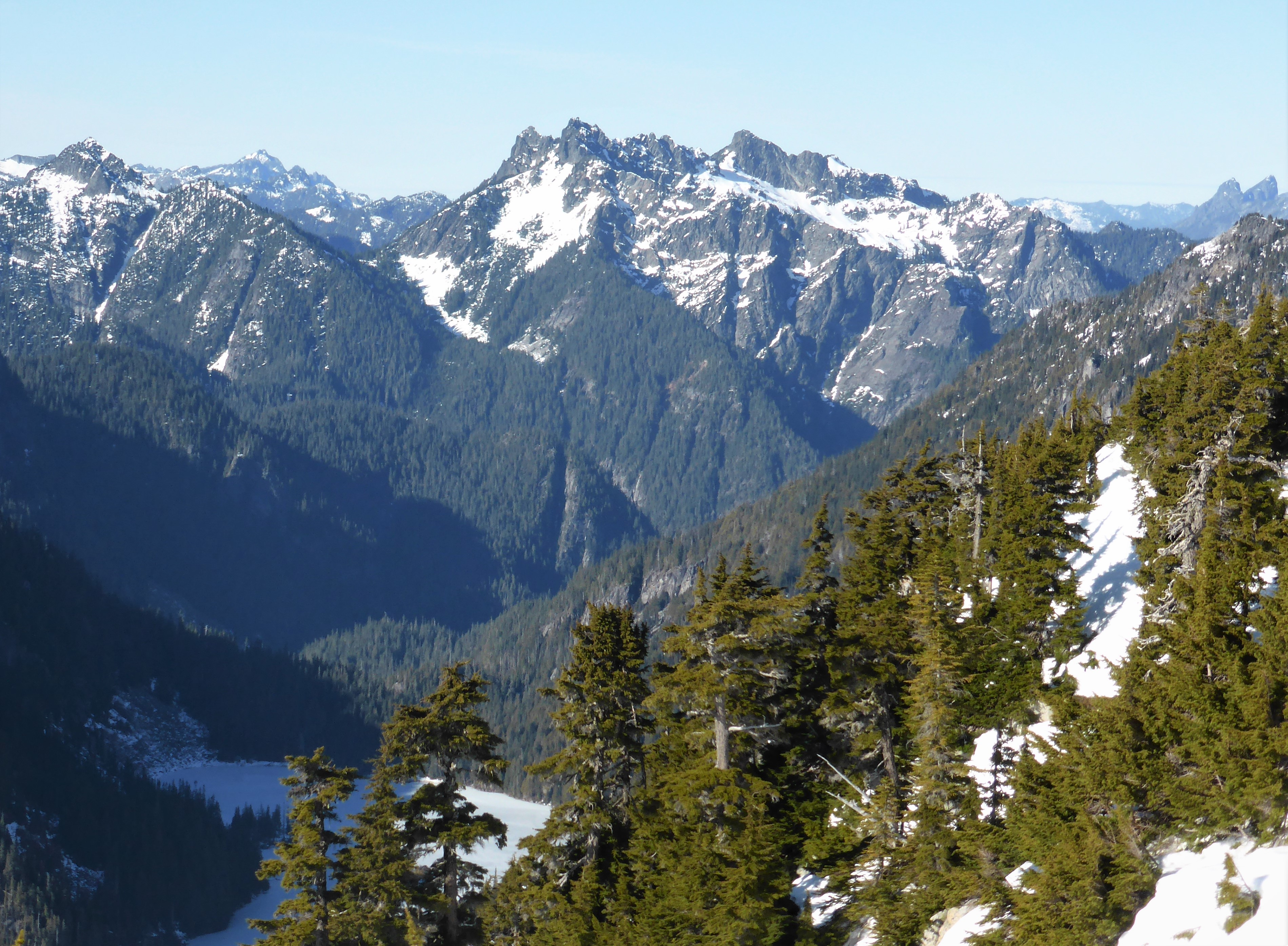
Malachite Peak from southeast

== Climate ==
Malachite Peak is located in the marine west coast climate zone of western North America. Weather fronts originating in the Pacific Ocean travel northeast toward the Cascade Mountains. As fronts approach, they are forced upward by the peaks of the Cascade Range, causing them to drop their moisture in the form of rain or snow onto the Cascades (Orographic lift). As a result, the west side of the Cascades experiences high precipitation, especially during the winter months in the form of snowfall. Because of maritime influence, snow tends to be wet and heavy, resulting in high avalanche danger. During winter months, weather is usually cloudy, but, due to high pressure systems over the Pacific Ocean that intensify during summer months, there is often little or no cloud cover during the summer.

== Geology ==
The Alpine Lakes Wilderness features some of the most rugged topography in the Cascade Range with craggy peaks and ridges, deep glacial valleys, and granite walls spotted with over 700 mountain lakes. Geological events occurring many years ago created the diverse topography and drastic elevation changes over the Cascade Range leading to the various climate differences.

The history of the formation of the Cascade Mountains dates back millions of years ago to the late Eocene Epoch. With the North American Plate overriding the Pacific Plate, episodes of volcanic igneous activity persisted. In addition, small fragments of the oceanic and continental lithosphere called terranes created the North Cascades about 50 million years ago.

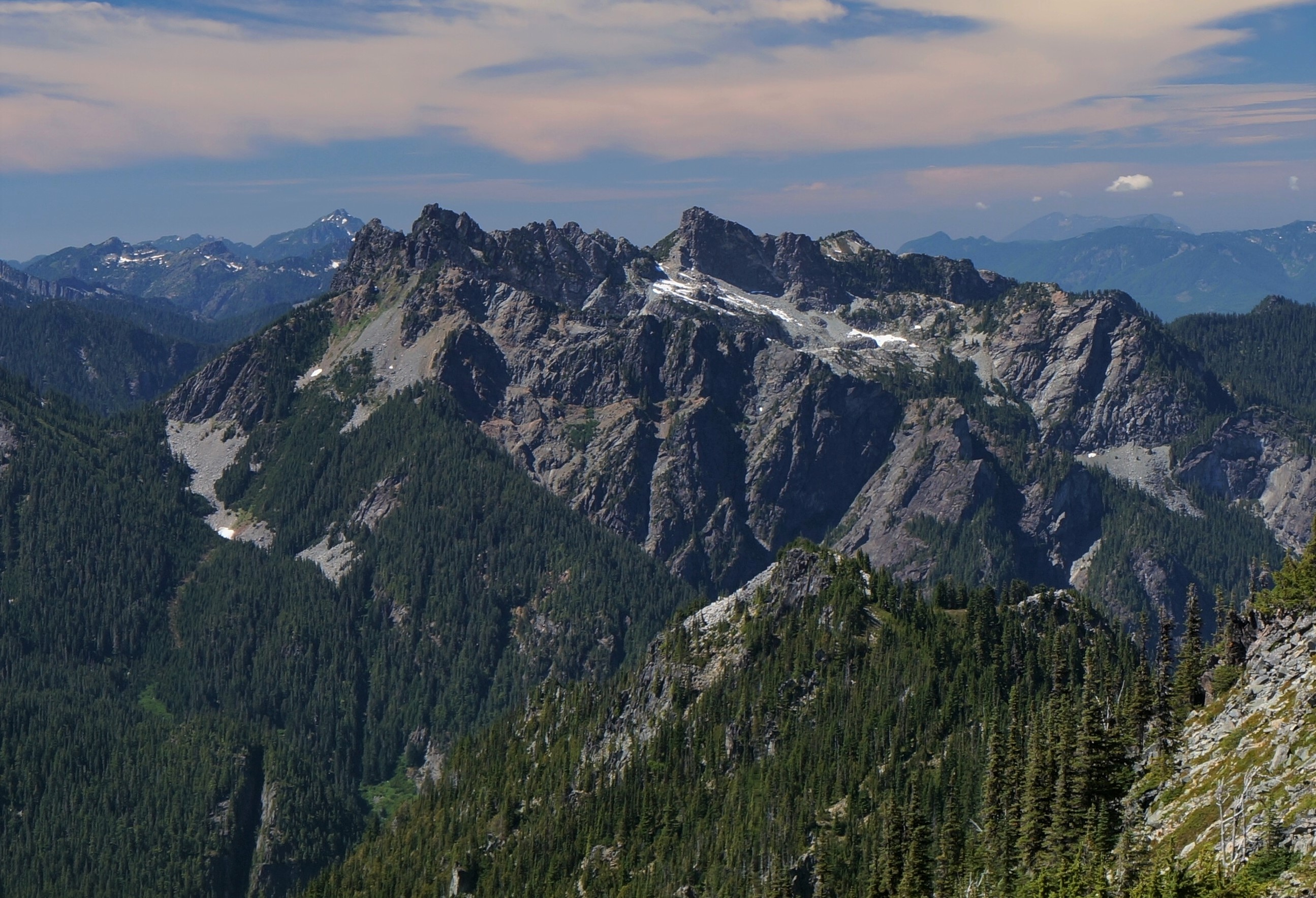
Malachite Peak from Otter Point

During the Pleistocene period dating back over two million years ago, glaciation advancing and retreating repeatedly scoured and shaped the landscape. The last glacial retreat in the Alpine Lakes area began about 14,000 years ago and was north of the Canada–US border by 10,000 years ago. The U-shaped cross section of the river valleys is a result of that recent glaciation. Uplift and faulting in combination with glaciation have been the dominant processes which have created the tall peaks and deep valleys of the Alpine Lakes Wilderness area.

== See also ==
- List of peaks of the Alpine Lakes Wilderness
