= Kimball Creek =

Kimball Creek may refer to:

- Kimball Creek (Minnesota), a tributary of Lake Superior
- Kimball Creek (Summit County, Utah), a tributary of East Canyon Creek
- Kimball Creek (West Branch Oswegatchie River tributary), a tributary of the West Branch Oswegatchie River, New York
