= Wild Goat Peak =

Mountain in Washington (state), United States

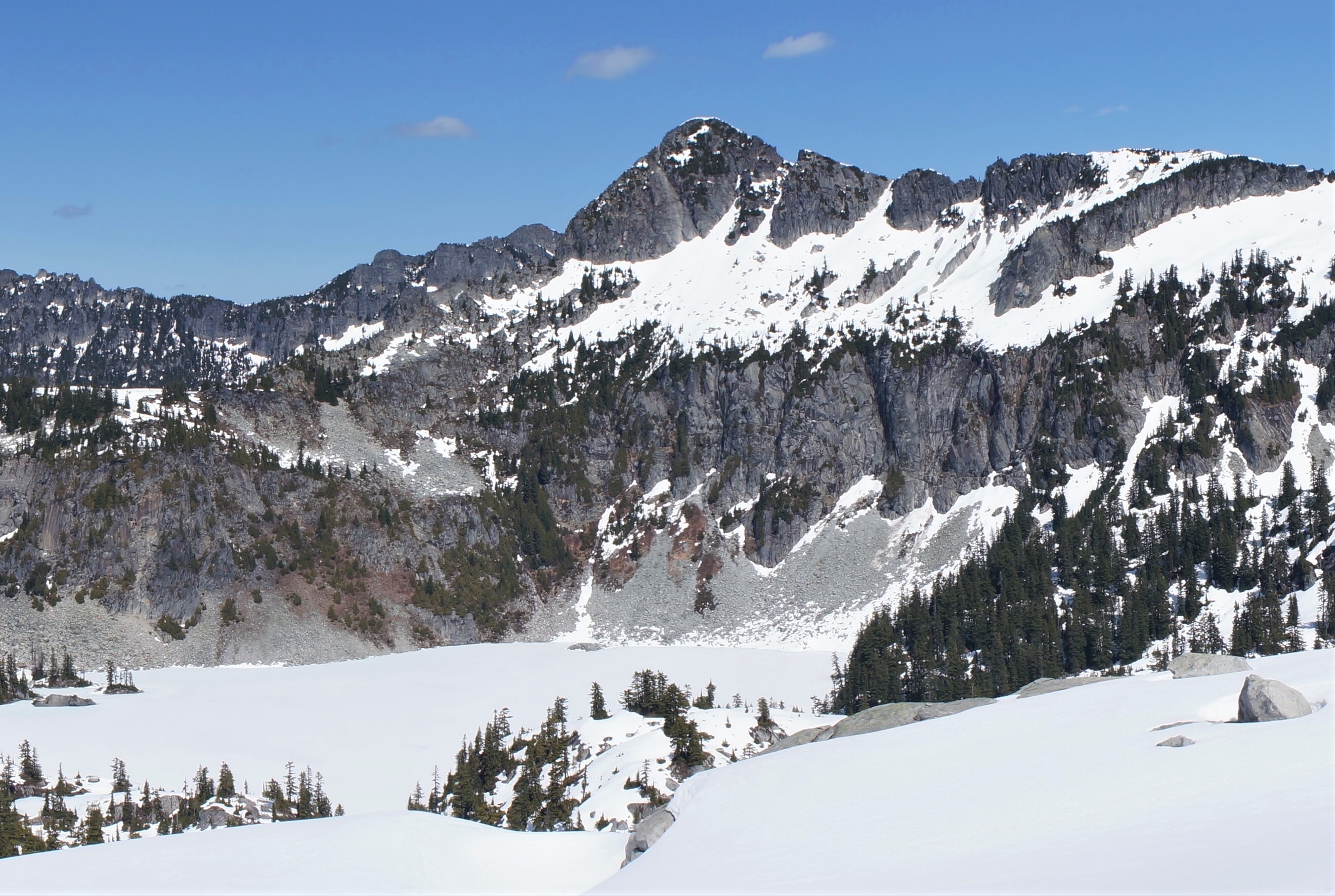
- West aspect, above Gold Lake

Highest point
- Elevation: 6,305 ft (1,922 m)
- Prominence: 545 ft (166 m)
- Parent peak: Big Snow Mountain (6,680 ft)
- Isolation: 1.91 mi (3.07 km)
- Coordinates: 47°33′08″N 121°20′04″W

Geography
- Location within Washington (state) Location within the United States
- Location: King County; Washington state, U.S.
- Parent range: Cascade Range
- Topo map: USGS Big Snow Mountain

Climbing
- Easiest route: scrambling East ridge

Wild Goat Peak is a 6,305-foot (1,922-metre) mountain summit located above the eastern shore of Gold Lake, in eastern King County of Washington state. It's part of the Cascade Range, and is situated in the Alpine Lakes Wilderness, on land managed by Mount Baker-Snoqualmie National Forest. Precipitation runoff from the mountain drains into tributaries of the Snoqualmie and Skykomish Rivers. The nearest higher neighbor is Big Snow Mountain, 1.91 mi (3.07 km) to the southwest. This peak was once called "Big Snowy".

== Climate ==
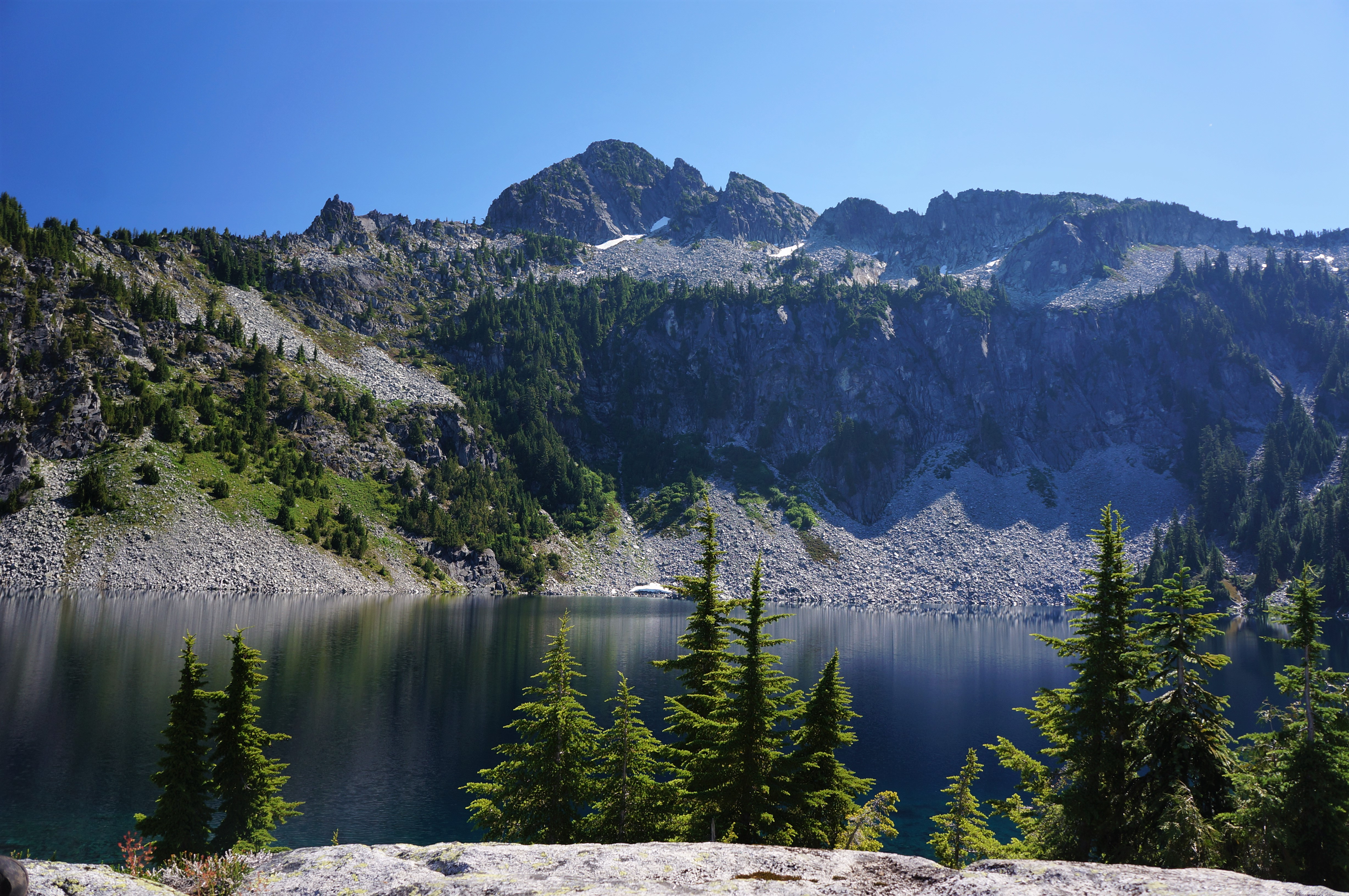
Gold Lake and Wild Goat Peak

Wild Goat Peak is located in the marine west coast climate zone of western North America. Most weather fronts originate in the Pacific Ocean, and travel northeast toward the Cascade Mountains. As fronts approach, they are forced upward by the peaks of the Cascade Range, causing them to drop their moisture in the form of rain or snowfall onto the Cascades (Orographic lift). As a result, the west side of the Cascades experiences high precipitation, especially during the winter months in the form of snowfall. During winter months, weather is usually cloudy, but, due to high pressure systems over the Pacific Ocean that intensify during summer months, there is often little or no cloud cover during the summer. Because of maritime influence, snow tends to be wet and heavy, resulting in avalanche danger. The months July through September offer the most favorable weather for viewing or climbing this peak.

== Geology ==
The Alpine Lakes Wilderness features some of the most rugged topography in the Cascade Range with craggy peaks and ridges, deep glacial valleys, and granite walls spotted with over 700 mountain lakes. Geological events occurring many years ago created the diverse topography and drastic elevation changes over the Cascade Range, leading to the various climate differences.

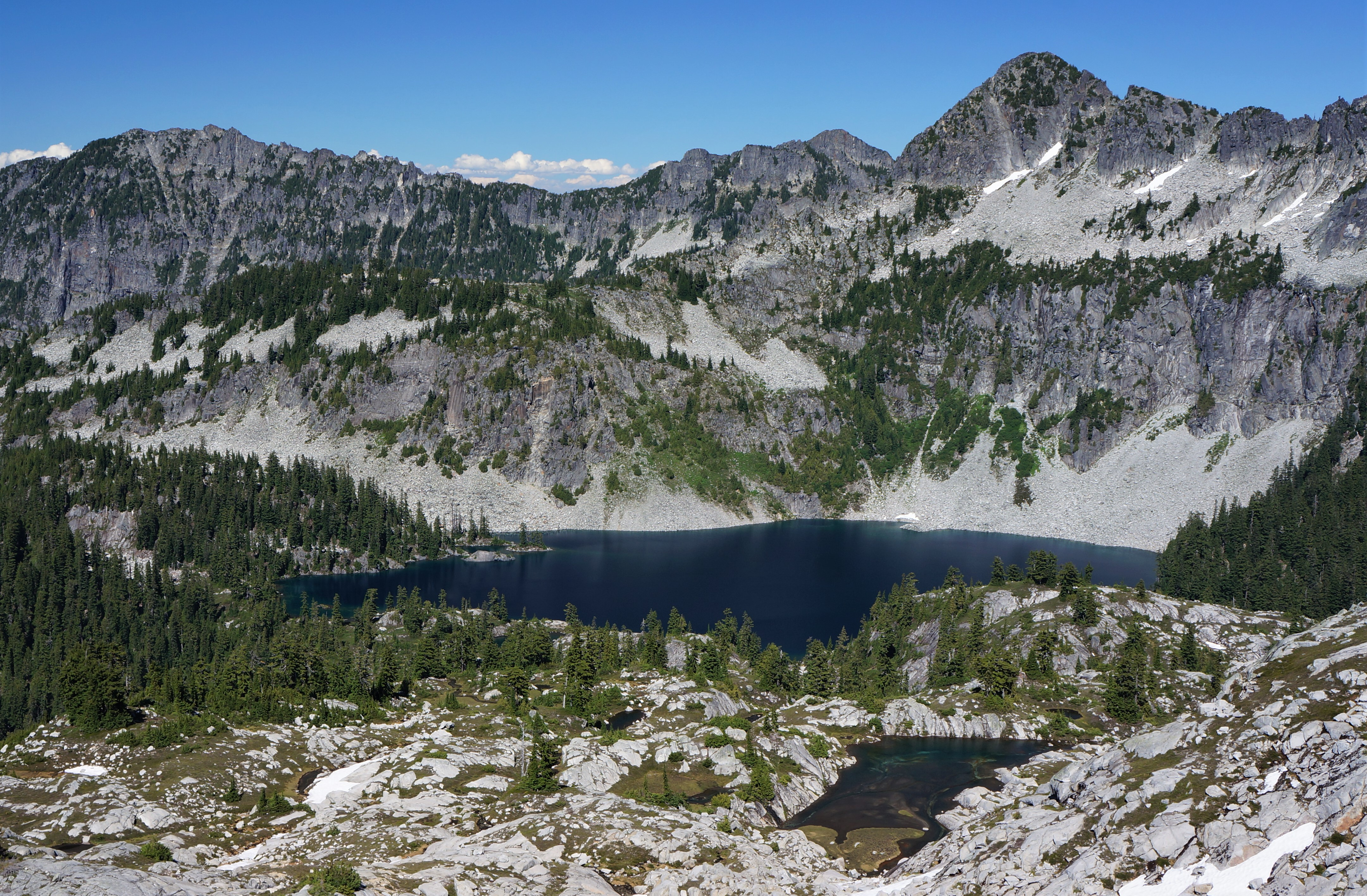
Camp Robber Peak and Wild Goat Peak (right)

The history of the formation of the Cascade Mountains dates back millions of years to the late Eocene Epoch. With the North American Plate overriding the Pacific Plate, episodes of volcanic igneous activity persisted. In addition, small fragments of the oceanic and continental lithosphere called terranes created the North Cascades about 50 million years ago.

During the Pleistocene period dating back over two million years ago, glaciation advancing and retreating repeatedly scoured and shaped the landscape. The last glacial retreat in the Alpine Lakes area began about 14,000 years ago and was north of the Canada–US border by 10,000 years ago. The U-shaped cross section of the river valleys is a result of that recent glaciation. Uplift and faulting in combination with glaciation have been the dominant processes which have created the tall peaks and deep valleys of the Alpine Lakes Wilderness area.

== See also ==
- List of peaks of the Alpine Lakes Wilderness
