= Silver Creek (Weber River tributary) =

Stream in Summit County, Utah, US

- Location of mouth

Location
- Country: United States
- State: Utah
- Region: Summit County, Utah

Physical characteristics
- Source: Northern slope of Bald Eagle Mountain in the Wasatch Range
  - location: 1.3 miles (2.1 km) southwest of Park City, Utah
  - coordinates: 40°37′44″N 111°31′00″W
  - elevation: 8,224 ft (2,507 m)
- Mouth: Confluence with Weber River
  - location: Wanship, Utah
  - coordinates: 40°48′59″N 111°23′58″W
  - elevation: 5,824 ft (1,775 m)
- Length: 19.3 mi (31.1 km)

Silver Creek is a 19.3-mile-long (31.1 km) north by northeastwards-flowing stream that begins 1.3 miles (2.1 km) southwest of Park City, Utah on Bald Eagle Mountain east of the Wasatch Range summit. It is a tributary of the upper Weber River in Summit County, Utah, which ultimately flows to the Great Salt Lake.

== History ==
Silver Creek was named for its crystal clear, sparkling water according to one source. Alternatively, the watersheds about Park City, including Silver Creek, were mined extensively for silver and other metal ores.

== Watershed and course ==
Silver Creek heads on the north slope of Bald Eagle Mountain in the Deer Valley Ski Resort. From there it flows north through Deer Valley Meadow then northwest through Park City, Utah. From Park City north through the Snyderville Basin there is a low topographic divide with McLeod Creek to the west and Silver Creek to the east. After passing through Park City Silver Creek turns east and follows Kearns Boulevard (Utah State Route 248) until it passes beneath Highway 40. East of Highway 40 Silver Creek turns north until it reaches and follows Interstate 80 along the Historic Rail Trail until it joins the upper Weber River at Wanship, Utah, while McLeod Creek continues north through the South Snyderville Basin east of Snyderville, Utah, and then through Parleys Park towards Interstate 80. Silver Creek then follows I80 northeast until it joins the Weber River at Wanship, Utah.

== Ecology and conservation ==
From the mid-1800s through the 1970s, the Silver Creek and nearby McLeod watersheds about Park City were mined extensively for silver and lead. Most of the mining on Silver Creek was in Empire Canyon. Tailing wastes from these mines continue to pollute Silver Creek, and to a less extent, McLeod and Kimball Creeks. A total maximum daily load report for zinc and cadmium was completed in 2004. However, 2003 testing of Silver Creek's trout found cadmium, zinc, and selenium below health safety levels with the exception of lead and arsenic. The fish sampled included native Bonneville cutthroat trout (Oncorhynchus clarkii utah) and non-native rainbow trout (Oncorhynchus mykiss) and brown trout (Salmo trutta).

== See also ==
- Weber River
