= Gold Lake (King County, Washington) =

Lake in Washingtion state, U.S.

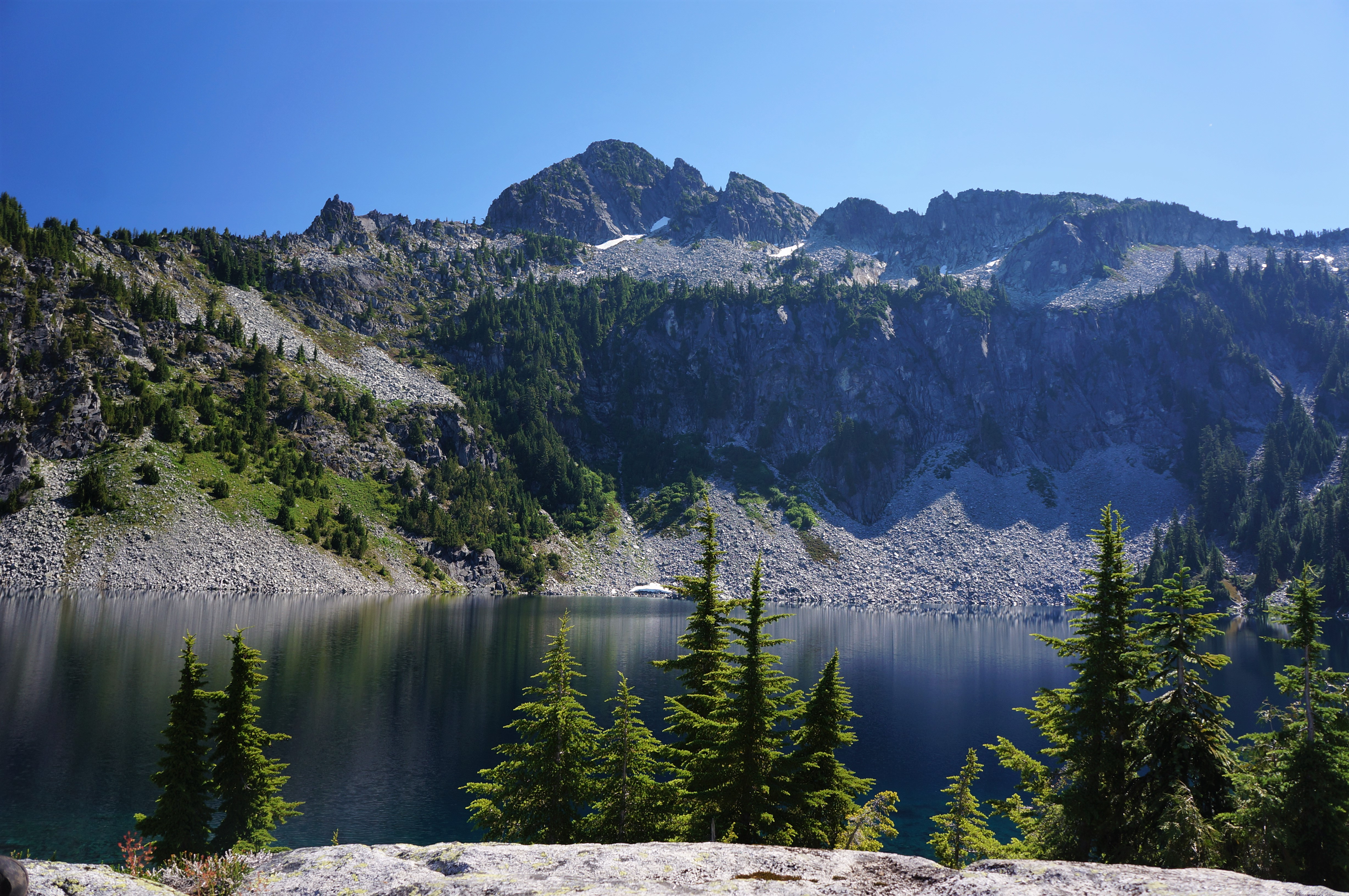
- Gold Lake and Wild Goat Peak in the background

- Location within Washington (state) Location within the United States
- Location: King County, Washington, United States
- Coordinates: 47.54995°N 121.34385°W
- Primary inflows: Big Snow Mountain
- Primary outflows: unnamed
- Basin countries: United States
- Surface elevation: 4,029 ft (1,228 m)

Gold Lake is a freshwater lake located on a valley on the west skirt of Wild Goat Peak, in King County, Washington. Gold Lake is surrounded by prominent peaks and lakes at the heart of the Alpine Lakes Wilderness, including Big Snow Mountain and Iron Cap Mountain.

== Waterfalls ==
The outflow of Gold Lake joins the creeks from Moira Lake, Fools Gold Lake and other snow melting creeks to empty as the inflow of Lake Dorothy, which is the origin of the East Fork of the Miller River. Shortly after the Gold Lake outflow, the creek plunges into an unrated waterfall, Gold Lake Falls. Approximately halfway downstream towards Lake Dorothy, where Moira Lake joins with a tributary, the creek produces an unnamed waterfall, and shortly before the inlet of Lake Dorothy, two additional consecutive waterfalls: 104 feet (32 m) Twist Falls and 36 feet (11 m) tall Lower Twist Falls.

== Access ==
Access to Gold Lake is through Dutch Miller Gap trail 1030 starting at Dingford Creek gate. The trail leads to a ridge of Big Snow Mountain towards Wild Goat Peak. Gold Lake is on the west side of the ridge, and Chetwoot Lake on the opposite side. The trail passes alongside Hardscrabble Creek and through Hardscrabble Lakes on the south skirt of Hardscrabble Dome. It follows a ridge towards Wild Snow Peak with Gold Lake on the north side of this ridge.

== See also ==
- List of lakes of the Alpine Lakes Wilderness
