= Mount Marsell =

Mountain in Utah, United States

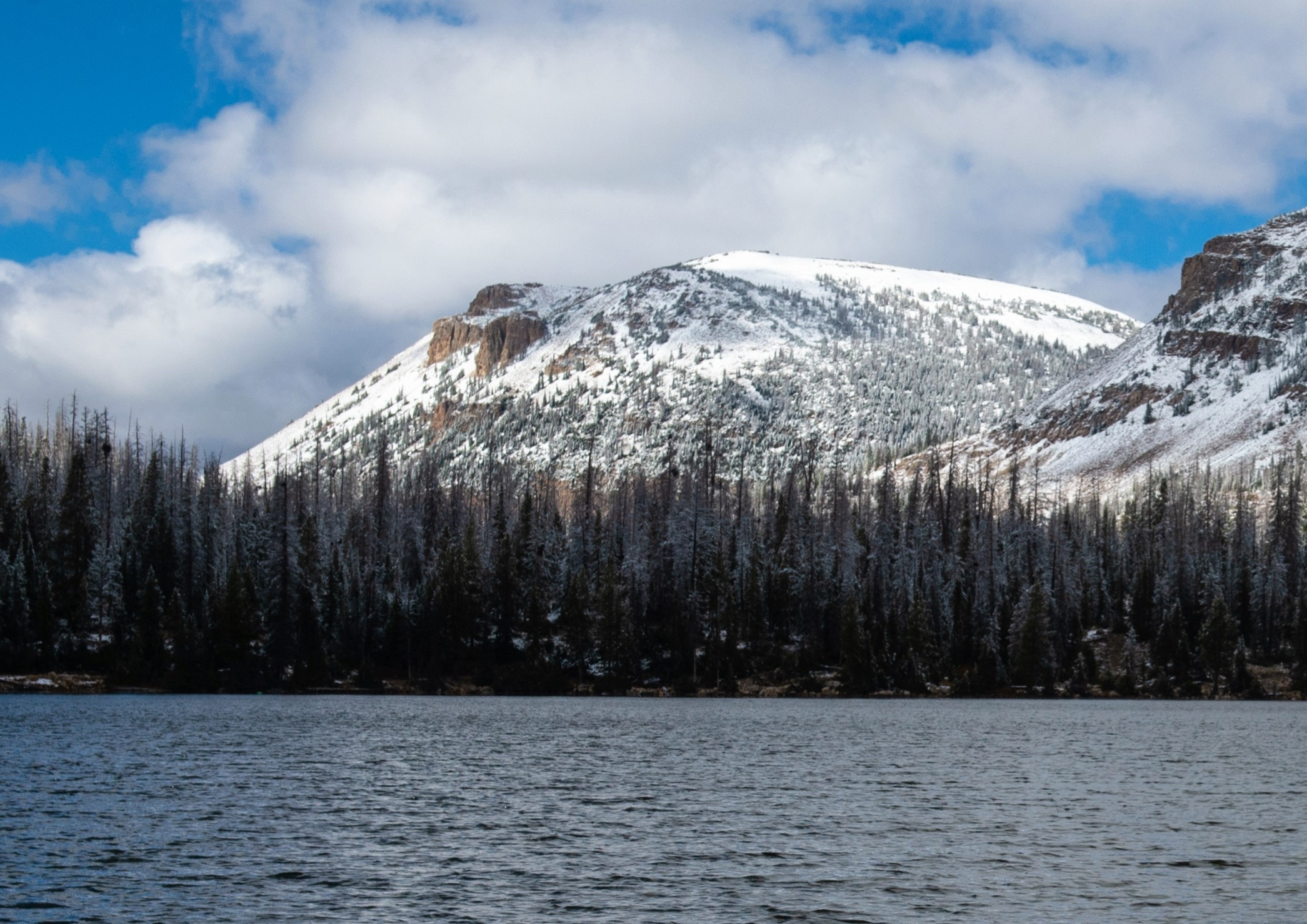
- Southeast aspect

Highest point
- Elevation: 11,340 ft (3,456 m)
- Prominence: 988 ft (301 m)
- Parent peak: Hayden Peak (12,484 ft)
- Isolation: 1.71 mi (2.75 km)
- Coordinates: 40°43′52″N 110°54′29″W

Naming
- Etymology: Ray Everett Marsell

Geography
- Location within Utah Location within the United States
- Country: United States
- State: Utah
- County: Summit
- Parent range: Uinta Mountains; Rocky Mountains
- Topo map: USGS Mirror Lake

Climbing
- Easiest route: class 2 hiking

Mount Marsell is an 11,340-foot-elevation (3,456-meter) mountain summit in Summit County, Utah, United States.

== Description ==
Mount Marsell is located 50 miles (80 km) east of Salt Lake City in the Uinta-Wasatch-Cache National Forest. It is situated in the western Uinta Mountains which are a subrange of the Rocky Mountains. Precipitation runoff from this mountain drains west into headwaters of the Weber River and east to the Bear River. Topographic relief is significant as the summit rises 1,960 feet (597 meters) above the Weber River in one mile (1.6 km). Access to the mountain is via the Mirror Lake Highway and hiking. The mountain's toponym was officially adopted in 1974 by the U.S. Board on Geographic Names to honor Dr. Ray E. Marsell (1893–1971), environmental geologist and professor at the University of Utah.

== Climate ==
Based on the Köppen climate classification, Mount Marsell is located in a subarctic climate zone with cold snowy winters and mild summers. Tundra climate characterizes the summit and highest slopes.

== See also ==
- Geology of the Uinta Mountains
- List of mountains in Utah
