= Kimball Stage Stop =

- U.S. National Register of Historic Places
- U.S. Historic district
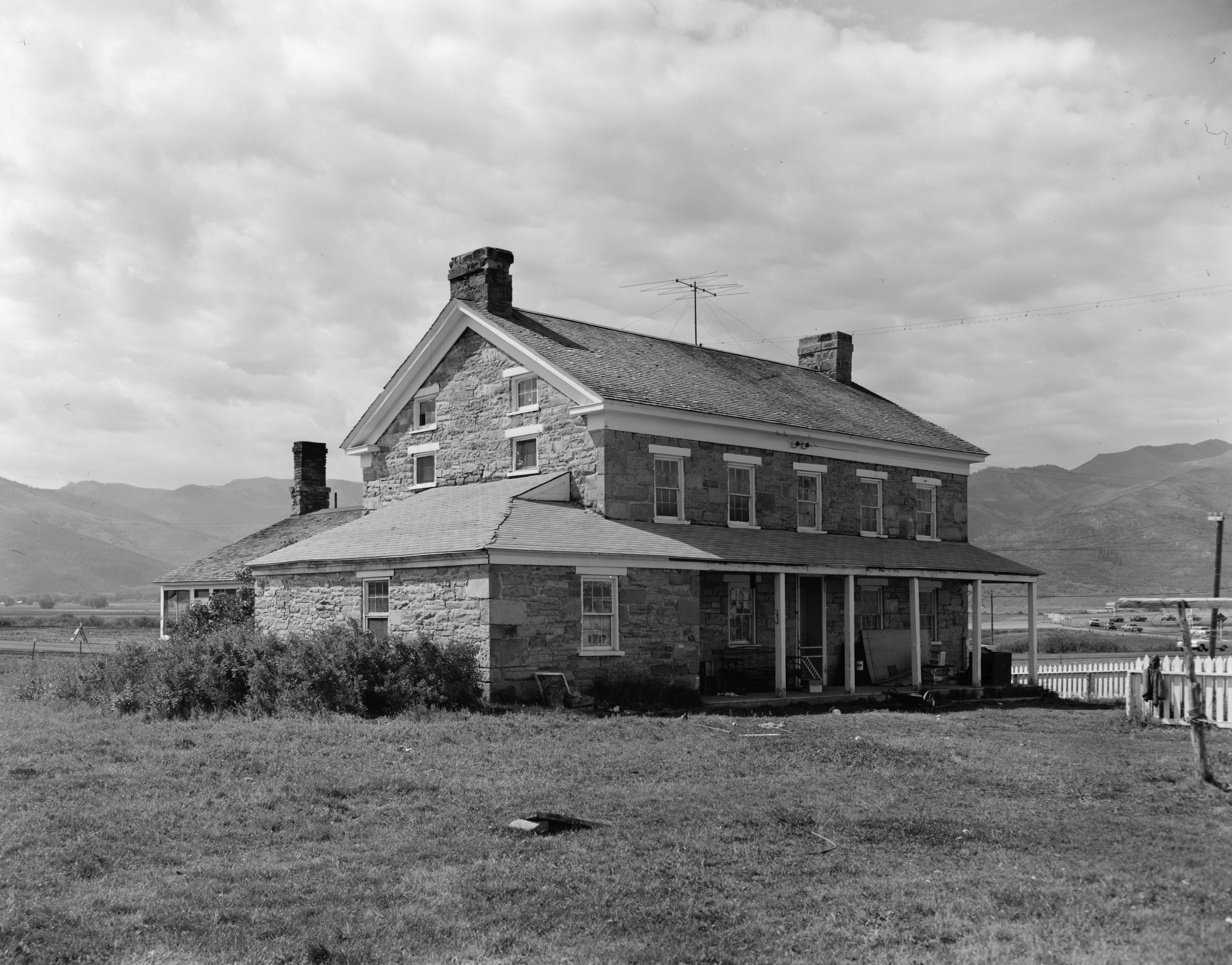
- HABS photograph of the Kimball Hotel in 1968

- Location within Utah Location within the United States
- Nearest city: Park City, Utah
- Coordinates: 40°43′24″N 111°31′2″W
- Area: 5.7 acres (2.3 ha)
- Architect: Kimball, William H.
- NRHP reference No.: 71000855
- Added to NRHP: April 16, 1971

The Kimball Stage Stop was a station on the Overland Trail near Park City, Utah. Located in the Parley's Park valley near U.S. Route 40 at the head of Parley's Canyon, the station was built by William H. Kimball in 1862. Kimball also built a bridge across nearby Kimball Creek. The station's hotel was notable for its dinners, and was visited by Mark Twain, Walt Whitman and Horace Greeley, served at first by Kimball's wife Melissa Burton Coray Kimball, and later by another of Kimball's wives, Martha Vance Kimball, . The station also served the Holladay Stage and the Wells Fargo Express Company.

The chief building in the complex is the hotel. It is a T-shaped two-story sandstone building, housing dining rooms, guest rooms, a store, and for a time, a post office. Two log barns are part of the complex.

The Kimball Stage Stop was placed on the National Register of Historic Places on April 16, 1971.
