= Mount Watson (Utah) =

Mountain in Utah, United States

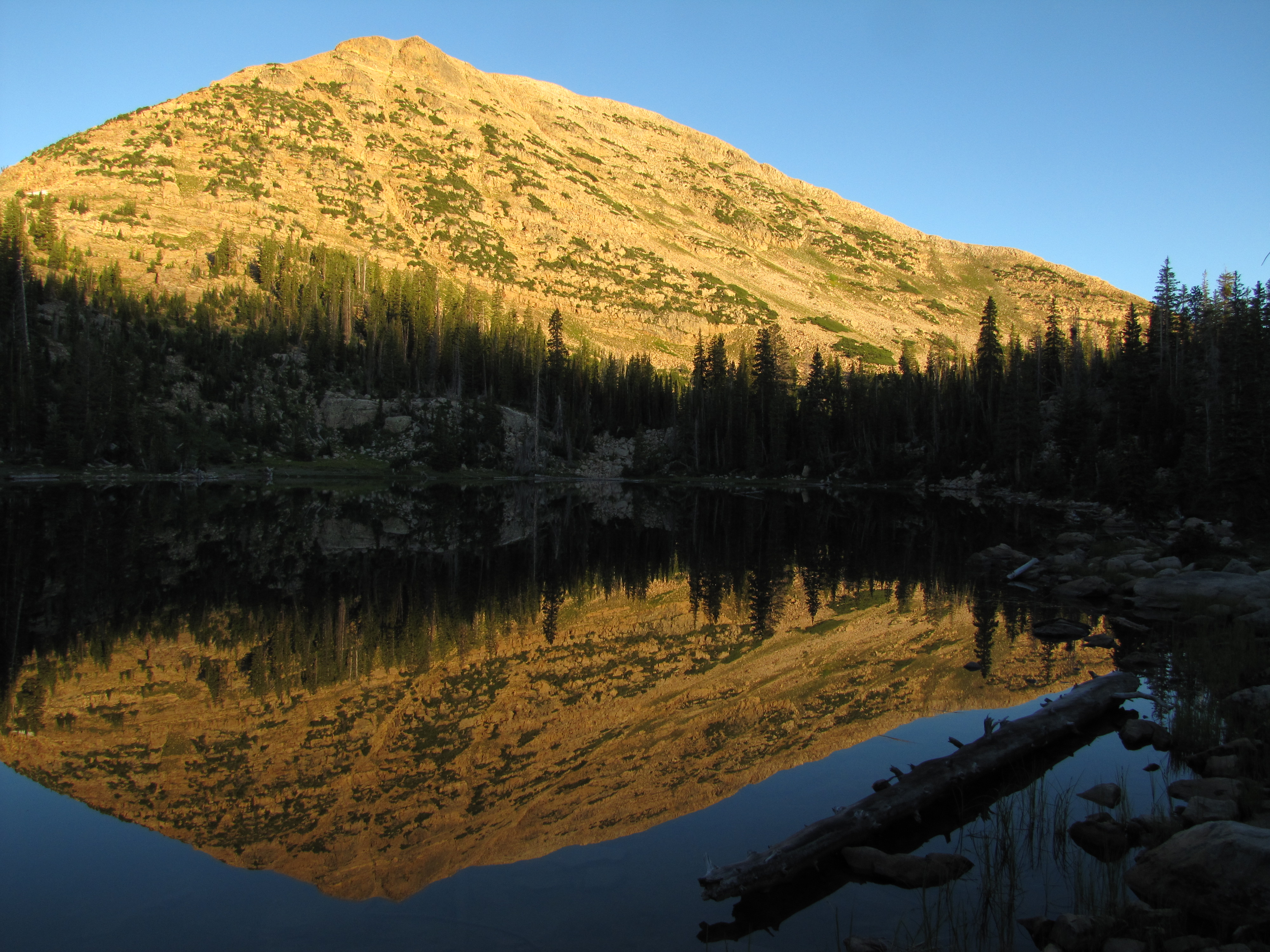
- Southeast aspect

Highest point
- Elevation: 11,521 ft (3,512 m)
- Prominence: 1,141 ft (348 m)
- Parent peak: Bald Mountain (11,949 ft)
- Isolation: 3.53 mi (5.68 km)
- Coordinates: 40°41′54″N 110°58′48″W

Geography
- Location within Utah Location within the United States
- Country: United States
- State: Utah
- County: Summit
- Parent range: Uinta Mountains; Rocky Mountains
- Topo map: USGS Mirror Lake

Geology
- Rock age: Precambrian
- Rock type(s): Arenite, Arkose

Climbing
- Easiest route: class 2 hiking

Mount Watson is an 11,521-foot-elevation (3,512-meter) mountain summit in Summit County, Utah, United States.

== Description ==
Mount Watson is set within the Uinta-Wasatch-Cache National Forest. It is situated in the western Uinta Mountains which are a subrange of the Rocky Mountains. Precipitation runoff from this mountain drains north into the Weber River and south into headwaters of the Provo River. Topographic relief is significant as the summit rises 1,700 feet (518 meters) above Middle Fork Weber River in one mile (1.6 km). Access to the mountain is via the Mirror Lake Highway and hiking. The mountain was so named around 1900, and the toponym was officially adopted in 1932 by the U.S. Board on Geographic Names.

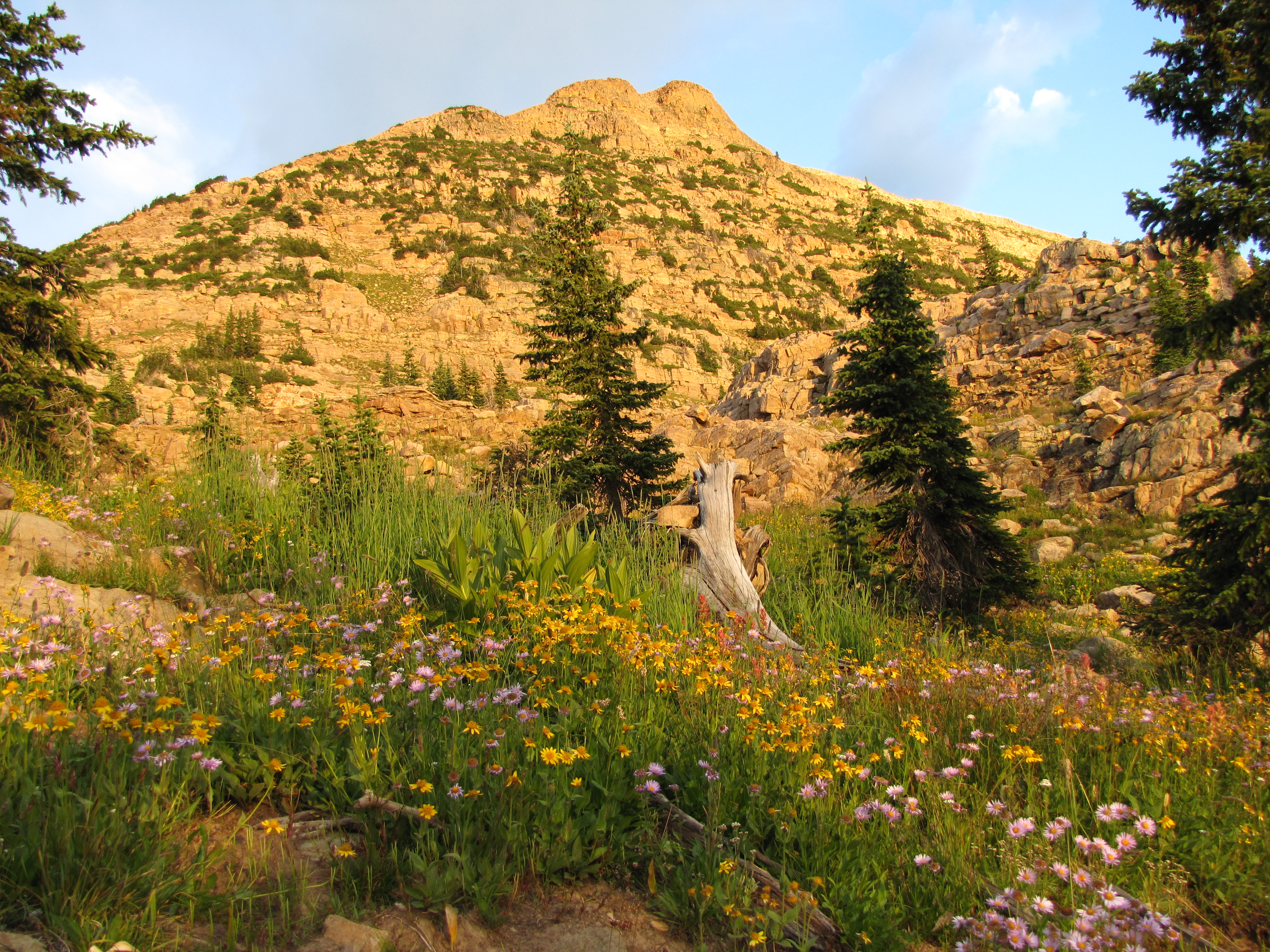
Mt. Watson

== Climate ==
Based on the Köppen climate classification, Mount Watson is located in a subarctic climate zone with cold snowy winters and mild summers. Tundra climate characterizes the summit and highest slopes.

== See also ==
- Geology of the Uinta Mountains
- List of mountains in Utah
