= McPolin Farmstead =

- U.S. National Register of Historic Places
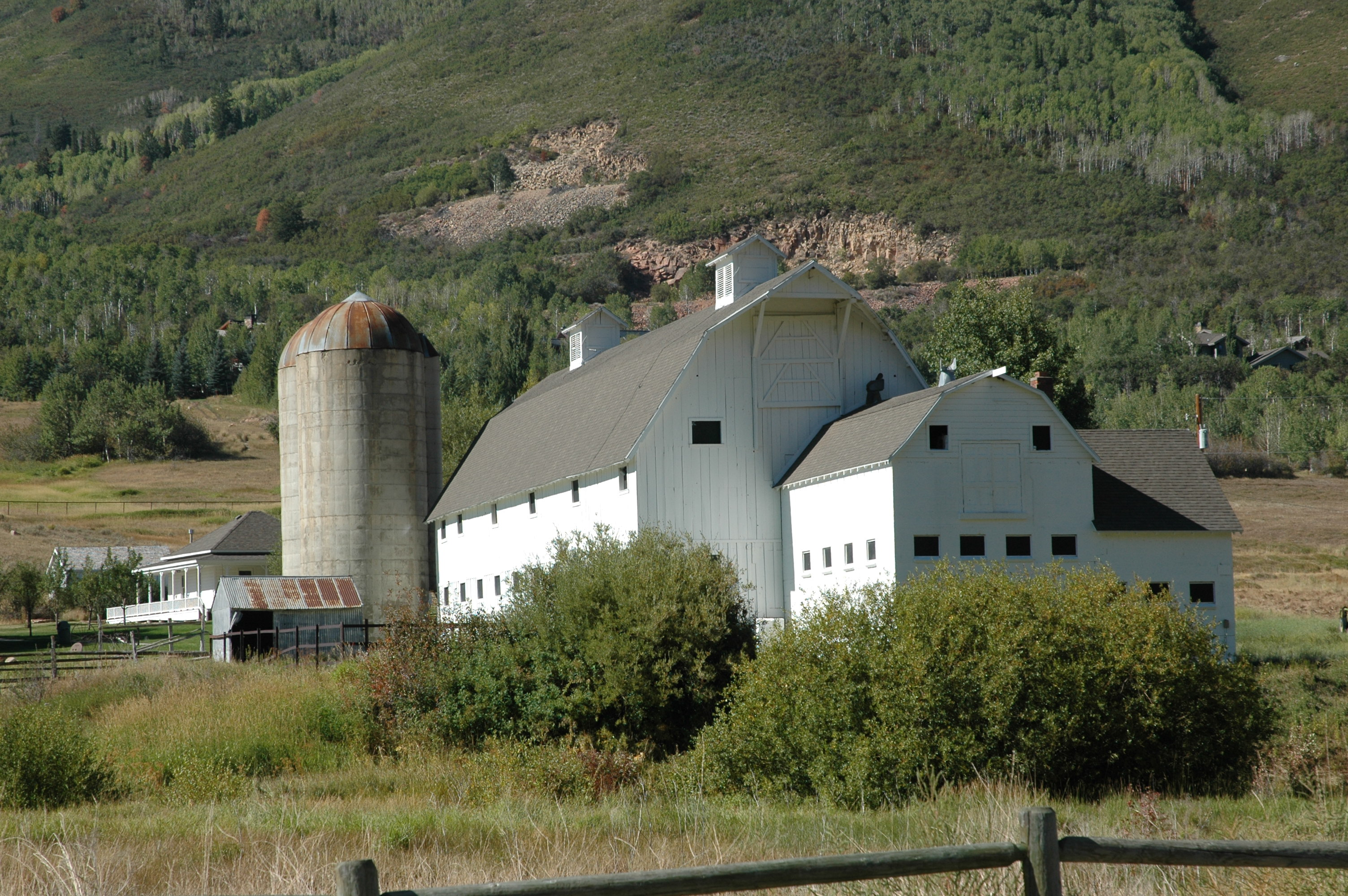

- Location within Utah Location within the United States
- Location: 3000 N. SR-224, Park City, Utah
- Coordinates: 40°40′38″N 111°31′36″W
- Area: 2 acres (0.81 ha)
- Built: c. 1921 – c. 1954, 1999
- Architectural style: Dairy Barn
- NRHP reference No.: 03000155
- Added to NRHP: August 14, 2003

The McPolin Farmstead is a historic farm north of Park City, Utah, United States. It has buildings constructed c. 1921 and later, including a large "improvement era" dairy barn, known as the "White Barn", approximately 100 by 35 feet (30 m × 11 m) in footprint. It was purchased by, and is owned by, the nearby city of Park City, Utah and lies on the northern edge of the city on the west side of Highway 224. It was listed on the National Register of Historic Places in 2003.
