= Camp robber =

The colloquial name camp robber is used for several North American species of birds (all corvids) known for their fearlessness around humans and their proclivity for stealing food from campers and picnickers:

- Canada jay (Perisoreus canadensis)
- Steller's jay (Cyanocitta stelleri)
- Clark's nutcracker (Nucifraga columbiana)
- Black-billed magpie (Pica hudsonia)
