= East Canyon Creek =

Stream in Utah, US

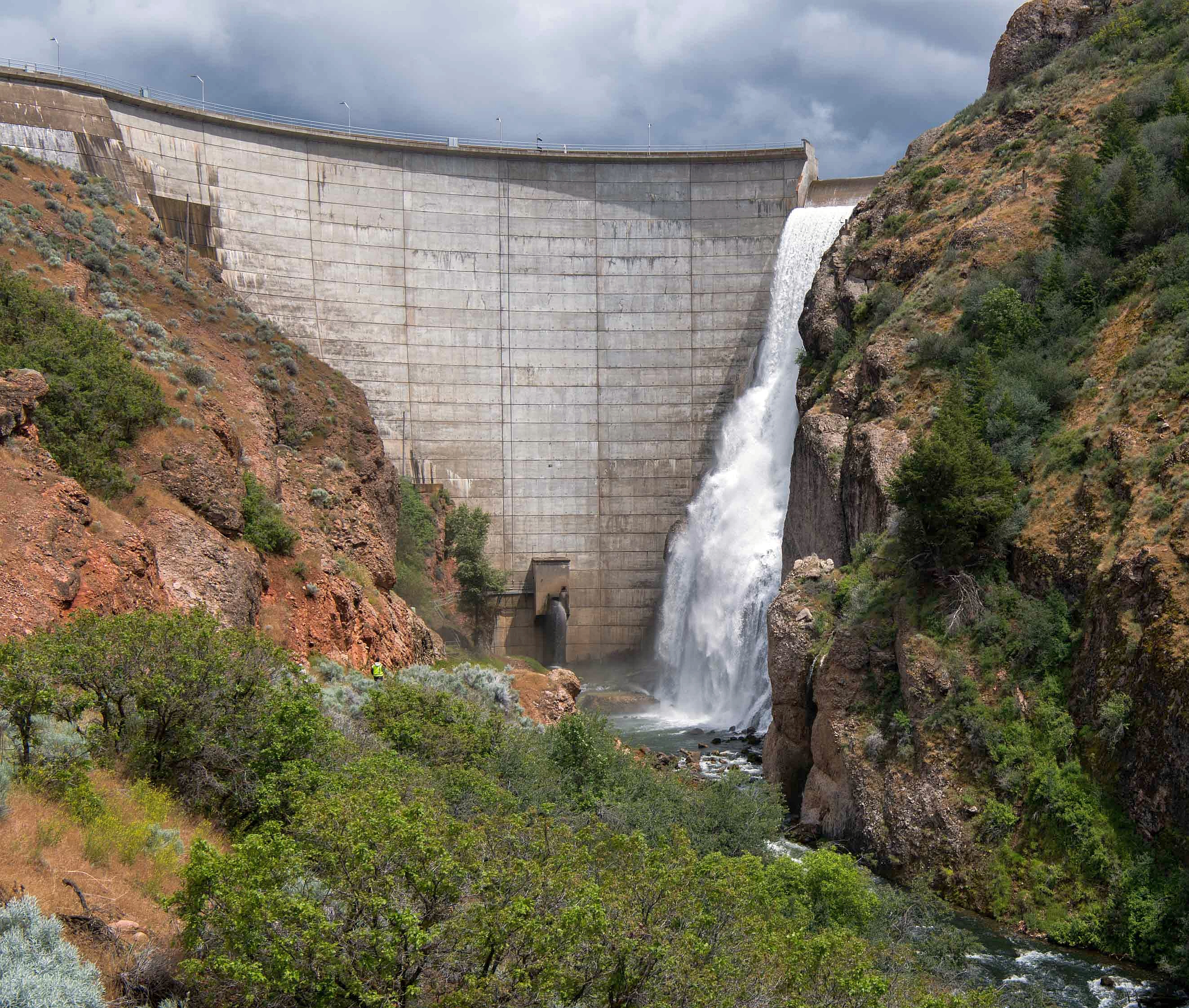
- East Canyon Creek spilling over East Canyon Reservoir Dam

- Location of mouth

Location
- Country: United States
- State: Utah
- Region: Morgan and Summit Counties

Physical characteristics
- Source: At the confluence of Kimball Creek and McLeod Creek in Summit County, Utah, Wasatch Range
  - location: 5.6 miles (9.0 km) north of Park City, Utah
  - coordinates: 40°43′26″N 111°31′07″W
  - elevation: 6,370 ft (1,940 m)
- Mouth: Weber River
  - location: 2.5 miles (4.0 km) northwest of Morgan, Utah
  - coordinates: 41°03′24″N 111°42′59″W
  - elevation: 5,000 ft (1,500 m)
- Length: 40.5 mi (65.2 km)

Basin features
- Tributaries
  - left: McLeod Creek, Three Mile Creek, Two Mile Creek, Quaking Aspen Creek, Monument Creek, Dry Pine Creek, Sawtooth Creek, Woods Creek, Hardscrabble Creek, Deep Creek
  - right: Kimball Creek, Porcupine Creek, Wet Fork Schuster Creek, Taylor Hollow Creek, Dixie Hollow Creek

East Canyon Creek is a 40.5-mile-long (65.2 km) north by northwest-flowing stream that begins northwest of Kimball Junction in Summit County, Utah, on the east side of the summit of the Wasatch Range, and flows to its confluence with the Weber River in Morgan County, Utah. East Canyon Creek is one of four major tributaries of the Weber River, which in turn, flows to the Great Salt Lake.

== History ==
The Mormon pioneers named the stream East Canyon Creek in 1847. Previously it was known as Bauchmins Creek after a local trapper.

== Watershed and course ==
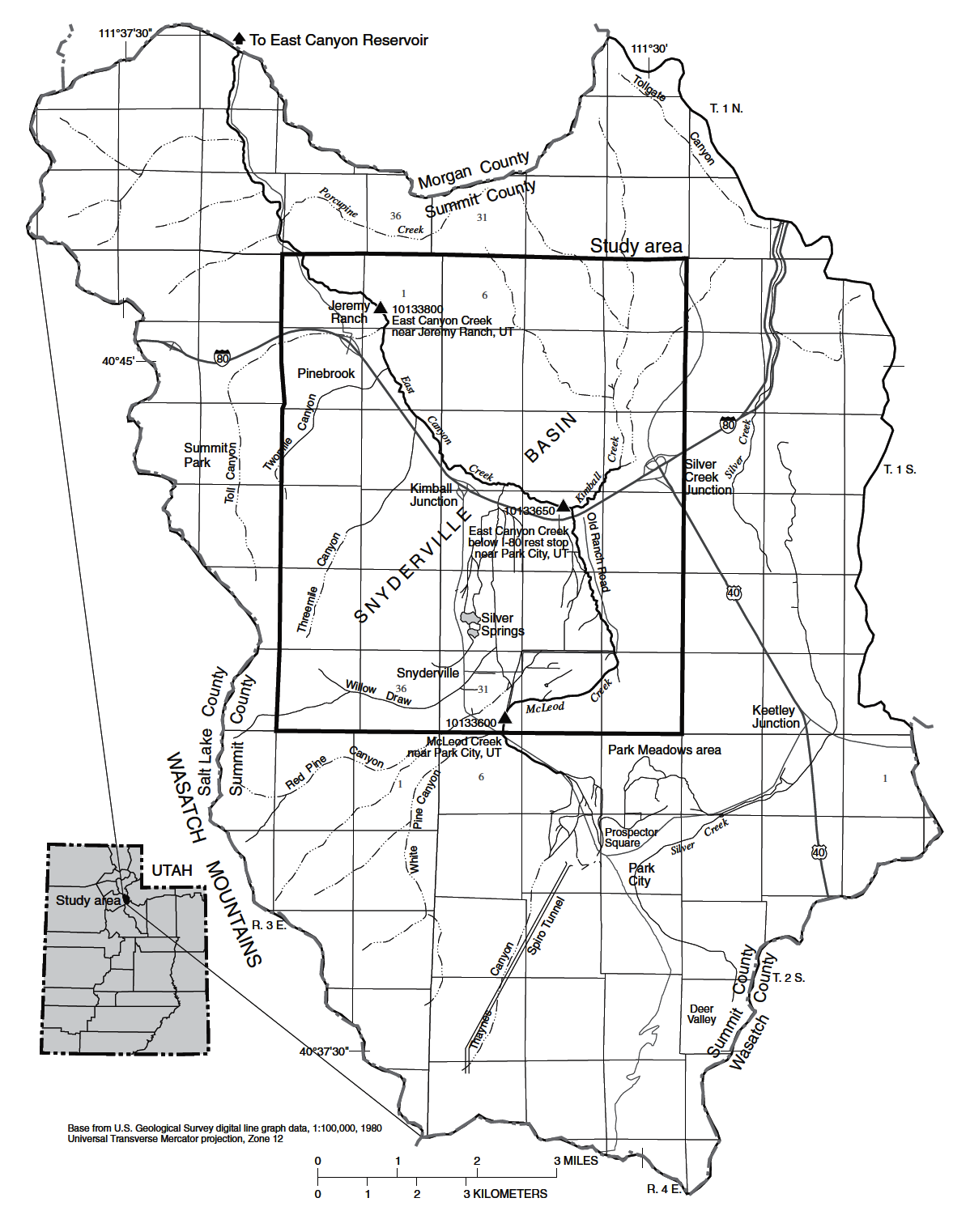
Map of Kimball Creek and McLeod Creek confluence, the source of East Canyon Creek in Summit County, Utah.

The total East Canyon Creek watershed drains 245 square miles (630 km^{2}) of the eastern slope of the Wasatch Range. The portion above East Canyon Reservoir drains 145 square miles (380 km^{2}) that includes Park City, Utah and several major ski resorts near its headwaters. Its origin is 1.4 miles (2.3 km) east of Kimball Junction in Morgan County, Utah, just north of Interstate 80 at the confluence of Kimball Creek and McLeod Creek in Summit County, Utah. Note the Geographic Names Information System (GNIS) likely needs to be corrected to be consistent with the U.S. Geological Survey report and map.

East Canyon Dam is at stream mile 17.8 miles (28.6 km), forming East Canyon Reservoir in East Canyon State Park. From the dam to the confluence of Kimball and McLeod Creeks is an additional 22.7 miles (36.5 km) for a total East Canyon Creek stream length of 40.5 miles (65.2 km).

== Ecology and conservation ==
Bonneville cutthroat trout (Oncorhynchus clarkii utah) is a Utah Sensitive subspecies of cutthroat trout and was the native trout species in East Canyon Creek, however it is thought to be extirpated due to decreased flows, increased nutrient input, degradation to water and habitat quality, and depredation by non-native introduced brown trout (Salmo trutta) and possibly by hybridization with non-native introduced rainbow trout (Oncorhynchus mykiss).

== See also ==
- Weber River
- East Canyon Dam
