= East Canyon State Park =

State park in Morgan County, Utah, United States

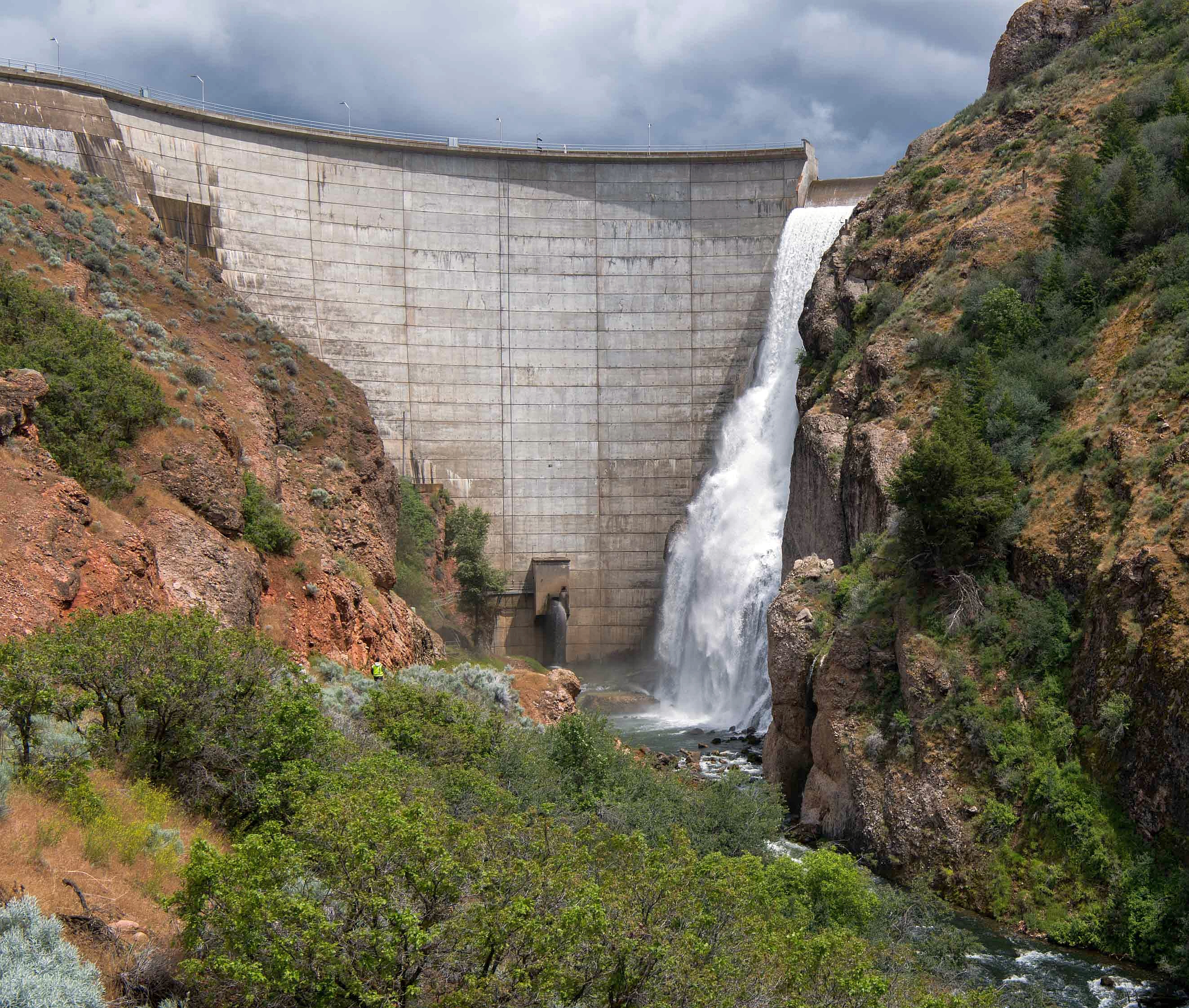
- East Canyon Dam

- Location within Utah Location within the United States
- Interactive map of East Canyon State Park
- Location: Morgan County, Utah, United States
- Coordinates: 40°54′4″N 111°35′13″W
- Area: 267 acres (108 ha)
- Elevation: 5,700 ft (1,700 m)
- Opened: 1962
- Operator: Utah State Parks
- Visitors: 232,639 (in 2025)
- Website: Official website
- Utah State Parks

East Canyon State Park is a state park of Utah, United States, featuring a 680-acre (280 ha) reservoir. The park is located northeast of Salt Lake City 8in Morgan County, Utah.

== Park facilities ==
Located in a narrow-walled canyon, East Canyon State Park is at an elevation of 5,700 feet (1,700 m). Park facilities are open year-round, and include a concrete boat launching ramp, paved parking, restrooms, showers, a fish cleaning station, a 33 unit RV campground with full and partial hookups, two covered group-use pavilions, boat rental, and a snack bar.

== East Canyon Dam ==
The East Canyon Dam 40°55′12″N 111°36′03″W is a 259-foot-high (79 m), 436-foot-long (133 m) arch concrete dam. Its base is 20 feet (6.1 m) wide, and its crest is 7 feet (2.1 m) wide. The reservoir is fed by East Canyon Creek and is part of the Weber Basin Project. It was constructed between 1964 and 1966.
