= Weber River =

River in Utah, United States

Weber River Ho-o-pah
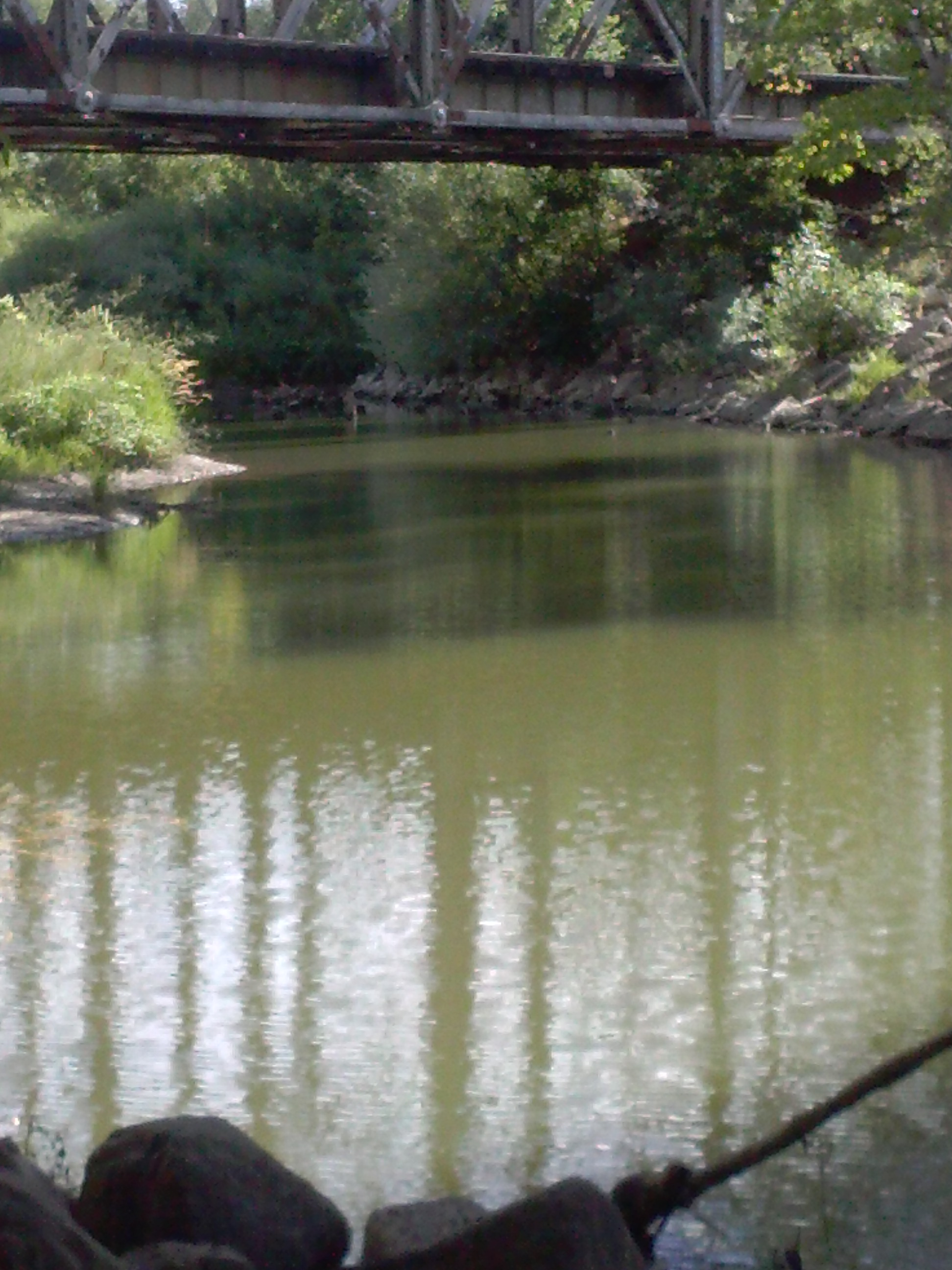

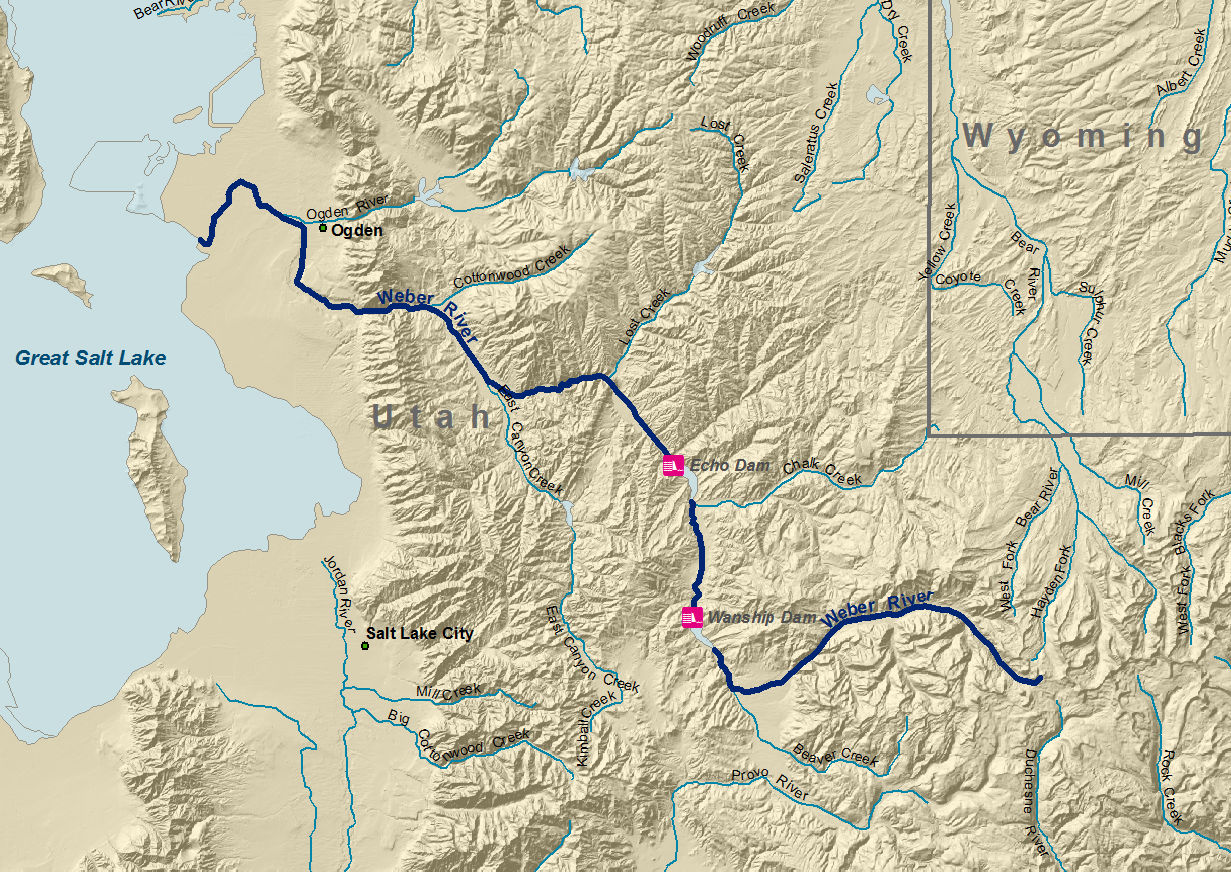
- A map of the Weber River

- Location of mouth in Utah

Location
- Country: United States
- State: Utah
- Counties: Weber, Davis, Morgan, Summit

Physical characteristics
- Source: Uinta Mountains
  - location: Utah
  - coordinates: 40.71578°N 110.8982269°W
- Mouth
  - location: Great Salt Lake
  - coordinates: 41°13′25″N 112°07′37″W
  - elevation: 4,209 ft (1,283 m)
- Length: 125 mi (201 km)
- Basin size: 1,627 sq mi (4,210 km^{2})
- Discharge
  - location: Ogden, Utah
  - average: 341 cu ft/s (9.7 m^{3}/s)

The Weber River (/ˈwiːbər/ WEE-bər) (Shoshone: Ho-o-pah) is a c. 125-mile (201 km) long river of northern Utah, United States. It begins in the northwest of the Uinta Mountains and empties into the Great Salt Lake. The Weber River was named for American fur trapper John Henry Weber.

The Weber River rises in the northwest of the Uinta Mountains, at the foot of peaks including Bald Mountain, Notch Mountain, Mount Marsell, and Mount Watson. It passes by Oakley, and fills the reservoir of Rockport Lake, then turns north, receiving the flow of major tributaries Silver Creek at Wanship and Chalk Creek at Coalville. Coalville is also at the upper end of Echo Reservoir; Below the reservoir, the river passes Henefer, turns more westerly, and then passes Morgan, where it receives East Canyon Creek. Issuing out of the mountains at Uintah at the mouth of Weber Canyon, it turns north again where it is joined by the Ogden River west of Ogden. The combined stream meanders across mostly-flat land, entering mud flats near where it empties into the Great Salt Lake, contributing about 25 percent of the total water entering the lake.

Among the fish to be found in the river are brook, brown, Bonneville cutthroat and stocked rainbow trout, and mountain whitefish.

The Weber has long been used for irrigation and is part of the United States Bureau of Reclamation's Weber Basin Project. Among the dams on the Weber are Wanship Dam on Rockport Reservoir (completed 1957) and Echo Dam (completed 1931). The watershed totals about 2,500 sq mi (6,500 km^{2}).

The Weber River is also home to a rare plant species Stephanomeria occultata, also known as Disguised or Hidden Wirelettuce, which is endemic to rocky slopes and margins along the corridor (B. Wellard & J.W. Baker 2018).

== See also ==
- List of rivers of Utah
- List of rivers in the Great Basin
