= Park City Transit =

Transit agency in Park City, Utah

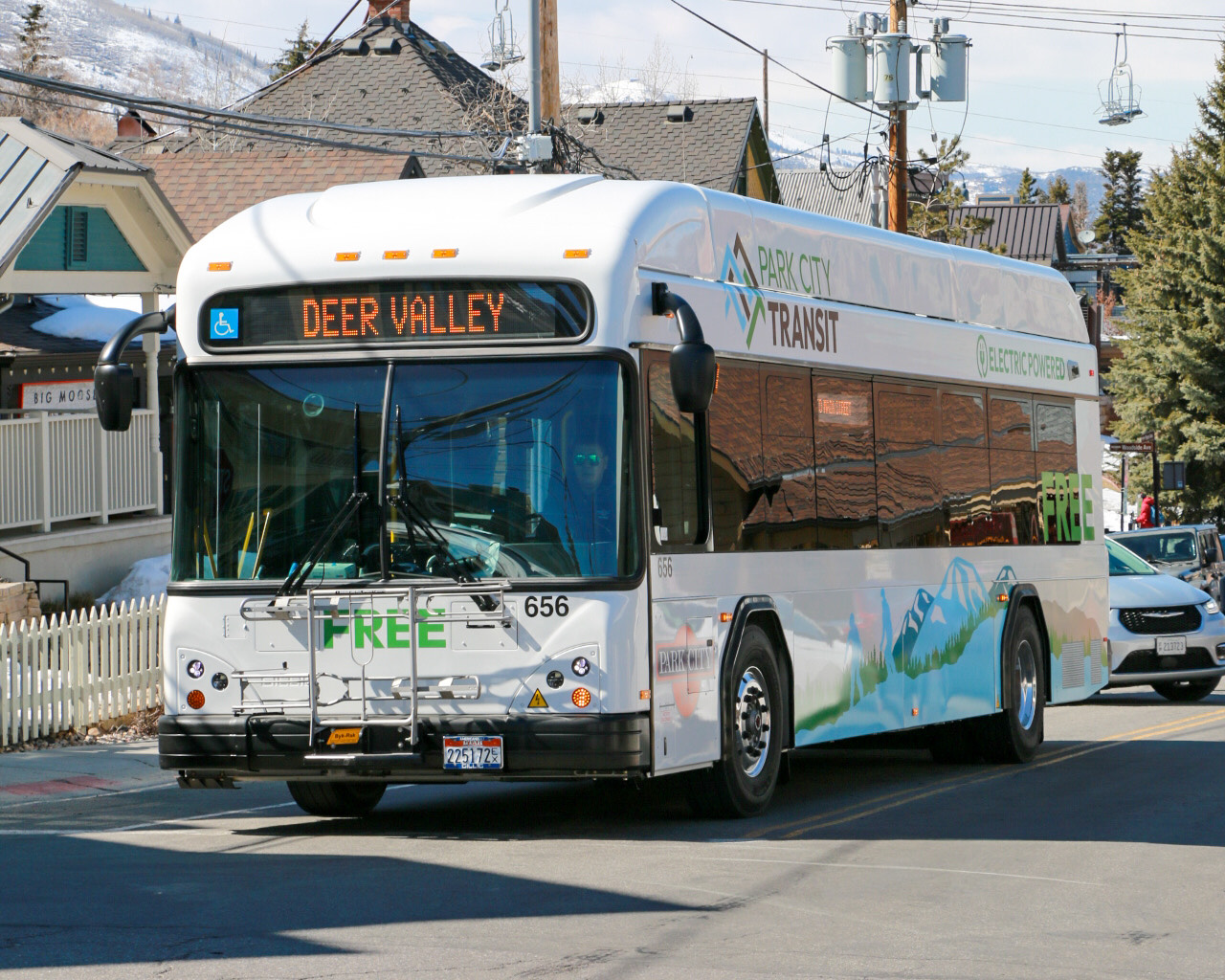

Overview
- Owner: Park City, Utah
- Locale: Park City, Utah
- Number of lines: 13
- Website: parkcity.org/departments/transit-bus

Operation
- Began operation: 1975
- Number of vehicles: 50+

Park City Transit is an American public transit agency that serves Park City, Utah. It provides fixed-route fare-free service and operates bus service on 13 fixed routes. The transit district has been operating since 1975 and has won awards from the American Public Transit Association and Utah's Best of State in 2023.

== History ==
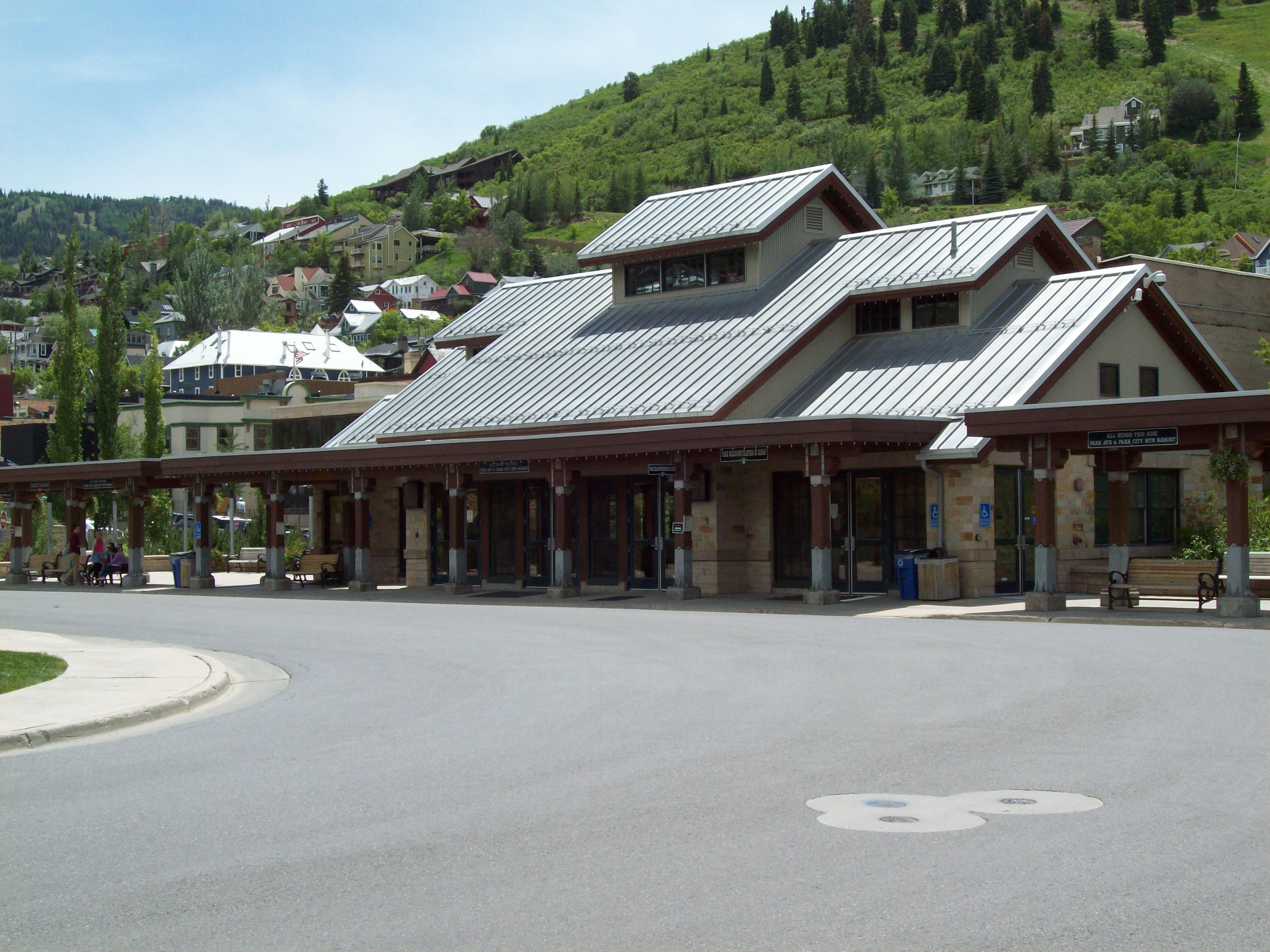
Park City's Old Town Transit Center

Park City Transit started operations in 1975 when Park City Municipal contracted Lewis Stages to run the first free bus service. In 1978, Park City enacted a transit tax and carried 165,000 passengers during its winter season. Four years later, in 1982, the first full-size buses enter Park City Transit's fleet, with UDOT later providing federal funding. In 1991, Park City Transit bought Gillig Phantoms to become compliant with the Americans with Disabilities Act of 1990. In 2000, the Old Town Transit Center (Park City Transit's main hub) broke ground. Later, in 2002, Park City Transit began bus service to Kimball Junction in order to meet demand for the 2002 Winter Olympics. In 2006, Summit County entered a joint agreement with Park City Transit to establish bus service further into the county.

the Utah Transit Authority in 2011 launched the PC-SLC connect, connecting the Wasatch Back with Salt Lake City. In 2013, Park City Transit build an employee housing facility near Park City's Public Works Building (The headquarters of Park City Transit). During that same year, bus-only lanes were implemented on select streets in Snyderville. In 2017, Park City Transit ordered six Proterra Catalysts as part of its new 10 White "Electric Express" route. In 2019, Park City's on-demand service began and passengers used Park City Transit to travel to destinations such as the Park City High School and Quinn's Junction. In 2020, Park City Transit received seven electric buses as part of an agreement with the Utah Transit Authority and the Utah Department of Transportation.

2021 saw Park City's partnership with Summit County on Public Transit end as High Valley Transit, a County-Endorsed program was created. The new transit authority was created to better-serve Summit and Wasatch counties. 2022 saw Park City Transit procure seven new electric buses, while in 2023, the transit district started its transformation of 72 bus stops. Park City Transit also purchased two additional electric buses in the same year. On April 28, 2024, Park City Transit ceded its 10 White line to High Valley Transit, with the route now operating as 10X: The Highline Express.

In April 2024, the Park City Council discontinued their contract with High Valley Transit to provide microtransit, citing high costs, long wait times, and users using the service while fixed public transportation was readily available. On October 14, 2024 Park City Transit unveiled new liveries for their buses in an effort to promote free public transportation.. In 2025, after a successful pilot program, Park City Transit now allows dogs to ride their buses.

== Transit hubs ==
=== Old Town Transit Center (OTTC) ===
The Old Town Transit Center is Park City's primary transit hub, with almost all of the transit district's routes going through the center. The hub is near Park City's historic Main Street and has an indoor lounge.

== Routes ==
Park City Transit routes are commonly referred to by both color and number.

Routes 1-Red, 5-Yellow, and 50-Teal all operate between Prospector Square and Snow Park Lodge at Deer Valley, but using different paths. Notably, the 50-Teal bypasses Park City Mountain Resort, offering a direct connection to Old Town and Deer Valley.

Routes 2-Green and 3-Blue serve the same loop through Park Meadows and Thaynes, but in opposite directions. 2-Green runs counter-clockwise while 3-Blue runs clockwise.

Routes 6-Silver, 7-Express, and 8-Express all serve Richardson Flat Park and Ride. The Express routes operate in the Winter only, and directly serve Park City Mountain Resort and Snow Park Lodge at Deer Valley, respectively.

Route	Terminus 1	Terminus 2	Notes
1 Red	Prospector Square	Snow Park Lodge, Deer Valley	
50 Teal	Prospector Square	Snow Park Lodge, Deer Valley	
5 Yellow	Prospector Square	Snow Park Lodge, Deer Valley	
2 Green	PC MARC	Snow Park Lodge, Deer Valley	Counter-clockwise loop
3 Blue	PC MARC	Snow Park Lodge, Deer Valley	Clockwise loop
20 Tan	PC MARC	Silver Lake Village, Deer Valley	
4 Orange	Old Town Transit Center (OTTC)	Silver Lake Village, Deer Valley	
9 Purple	Old Town Transit Center (OTTC)	Montage, Deer Valley	
6 Silver	Richardson Flat Park and Ride	Old Town Transit Center (OTTC)	
7 Express	Richardson Flat Park and Ride	Park City Mountain Resort	Winter-only
8 Express	Richardson Flat Park and Ride	Snow Park Lodge, Deer Valley	Winter-only
Trolley	Main St and 9th St	Main St and Hillside	
City-wide	City-wide	City-wide	Late-night service. Winter-only

== Fleet ==
Bus Number	Make and Model	Year	Engine	Transmission	Image	Notes
675, 9757, 9759, 9770-9772	Gillig Low Floor 35'	?	Cummins ISL9 8.9L Turbodiesel	Allison B400R6	Park City Transit Bus 9770	New livery
1884	Gillig Trolley Replica 29'	2016	Cummins ISL9 8.9L Turbodiesel (EPA 2013)	Allison B400R6		Dedicated to the Main Street Trolley. Bus number is Park City's founding date, 1884
634-644	Gillig BRT 35'	2016, 2017	Cummins ISL9 8.9L Turbodiesel	Allison B400R6		630-633 transferred to High Valley Transit
652-658, 2501-2502, 2511-2512	Gillig Low-floor Electric 35'	2023, 2025	Electric	N/A		New livery. Buses 2501-XX were ordered to replace the outdated Proterra Catalysts (645-651; 690-695).

=== Retired Fleet ===
Bus Number	Make and Model	Year	Engine	Transmission	Image	Notes
648-665	Gillig Low Floor 35'					
667-673	Gillig Low Floor 35'	2006	Cummins ISL 8.9L Turbodiesel (EPA 2004)	Allison B400R6		
674-677	Gillig Low Floor 35'	2008	Cummins ISL 8.9L Turbodiesel (EPA 2007)	Allison B400R6		
678-681	Gillig Low Floor 35'	2010	Cummins ISL9 8.9L Turbodiesel (EPA 2010)	Allison B400R6		Bus 680 transferred to HVT. Bus 678 auctioned off.
645-651	Proterra Catalyst BE35	2018	Electric	N/A		Known for being unreliable. Proterra, the manufacturer, is now bankrupt; these buses have since been replaced by 25XX and 97XX..
691-695	Proterra Catalyst BE40	2016	Electric	N/A		First batch of electric buses for Park City. Buses are marked with Electric Xpress and were exclusively used on 10 White, until the discontinuation. All retired.
