= Kimball Junction Transit Center =

Transit hub located in Kimball Junction, Utah

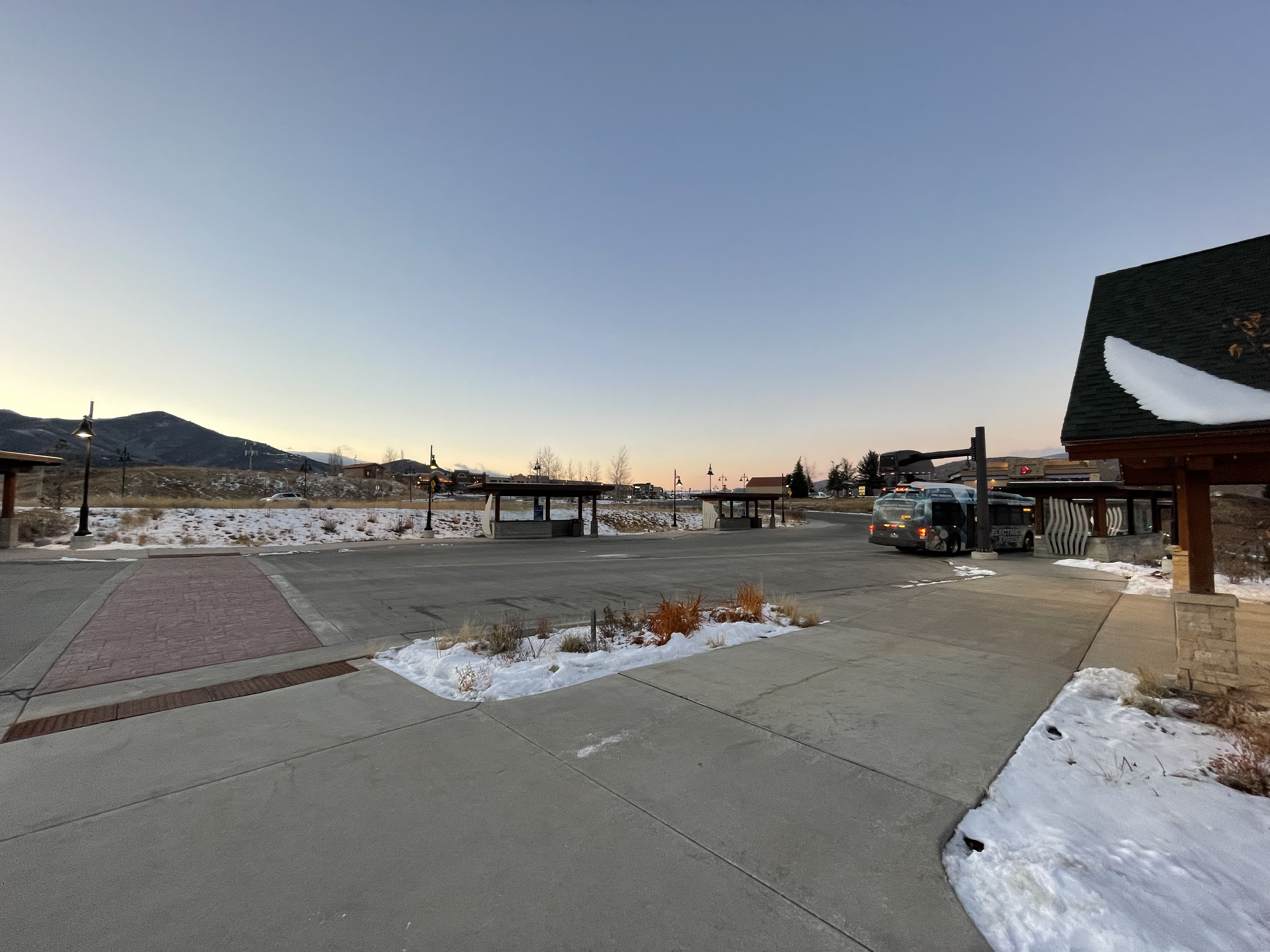

General information
- Location: 6506 N Landmark Dr, Park City, UT 84098; United States of America
- Coordinates: 40.72405036056205°N 111.54668173311539°W
- Lines: 10X Highliner; 101 Spiro; 103 Kimball Junction Shuttle; 104 Bitner Loop; 107 Salt Lake Connector; 108 Silver Creek Village
- Bus operators: High Valley Transit

Construction
- Parking: 34 Spaces

History
- Opened: 2017
Location

The Kimball Junction Transit Center is a transit hub located in Kimball Junction, Utah. It serves High Valley Transit, a transit authority that serves the Wasatch Back. The Kimball Junction Transit Center used to serve Park City Transit until April 28, 2024, where its 10 White line was ceded to High Valley Transit.

== Amenities ==
The Transit Center provides 34 parking spots and is adjacent to the Sheldon Richards's Building. It completed construction in 2017 and has a 2,400 sq. ft. waiting area, along with temporary bike and ski/snowboard storage.

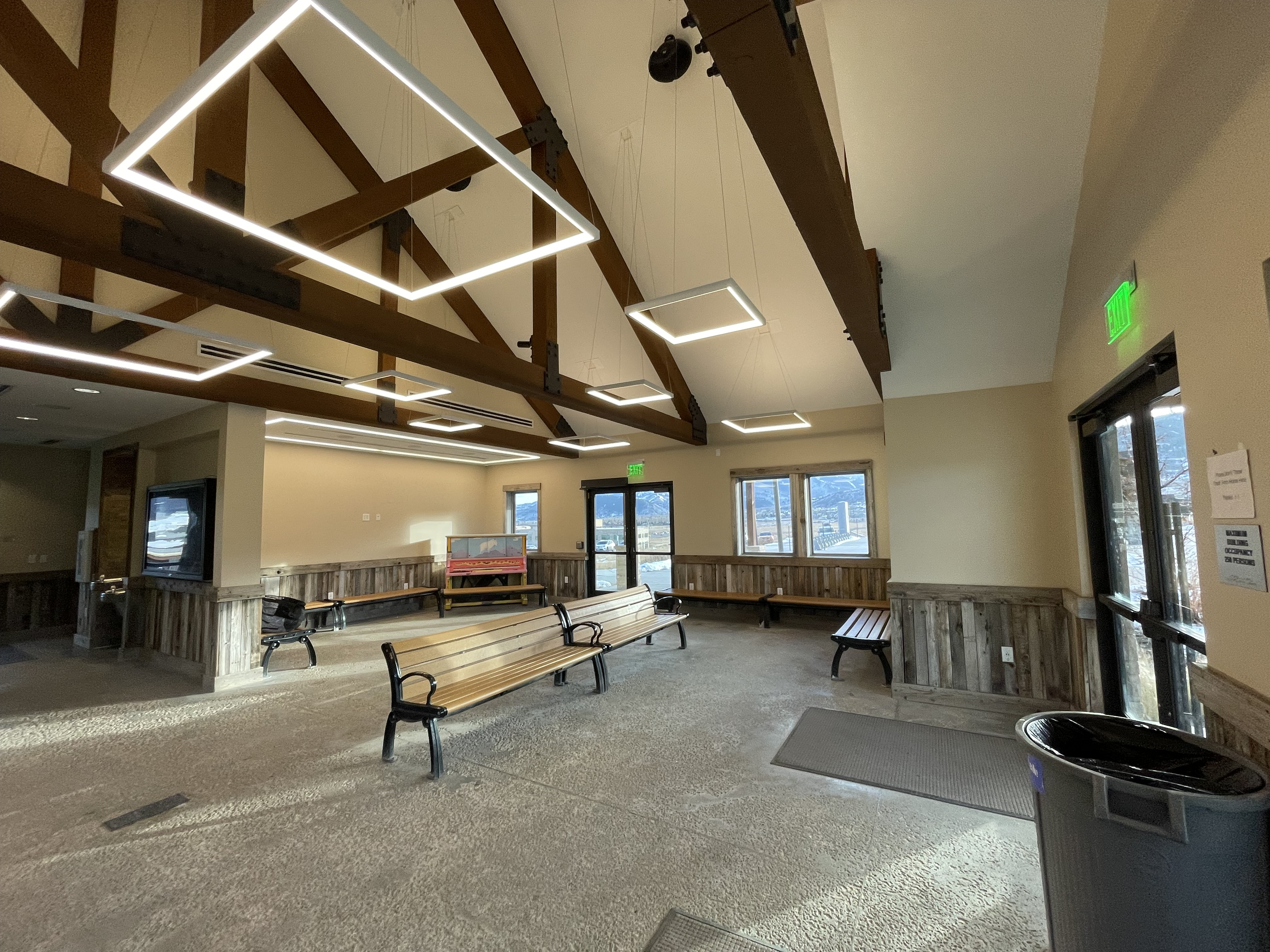
Image of the waiting area adjacent to the Kimball Junction Transit Center

=== Routes served ===
High Valley operates routes to Park City and Summit Park via its 101 and 10X routes, Salt Lake City via its 107 Route, and serves Kimball Junction with its Microtransit service and 103 & 104 routes. Jeremy Ranch and Silver Creek area with route the route 108
