= High Valley Transit =

Transit agency in Summit County, Utah

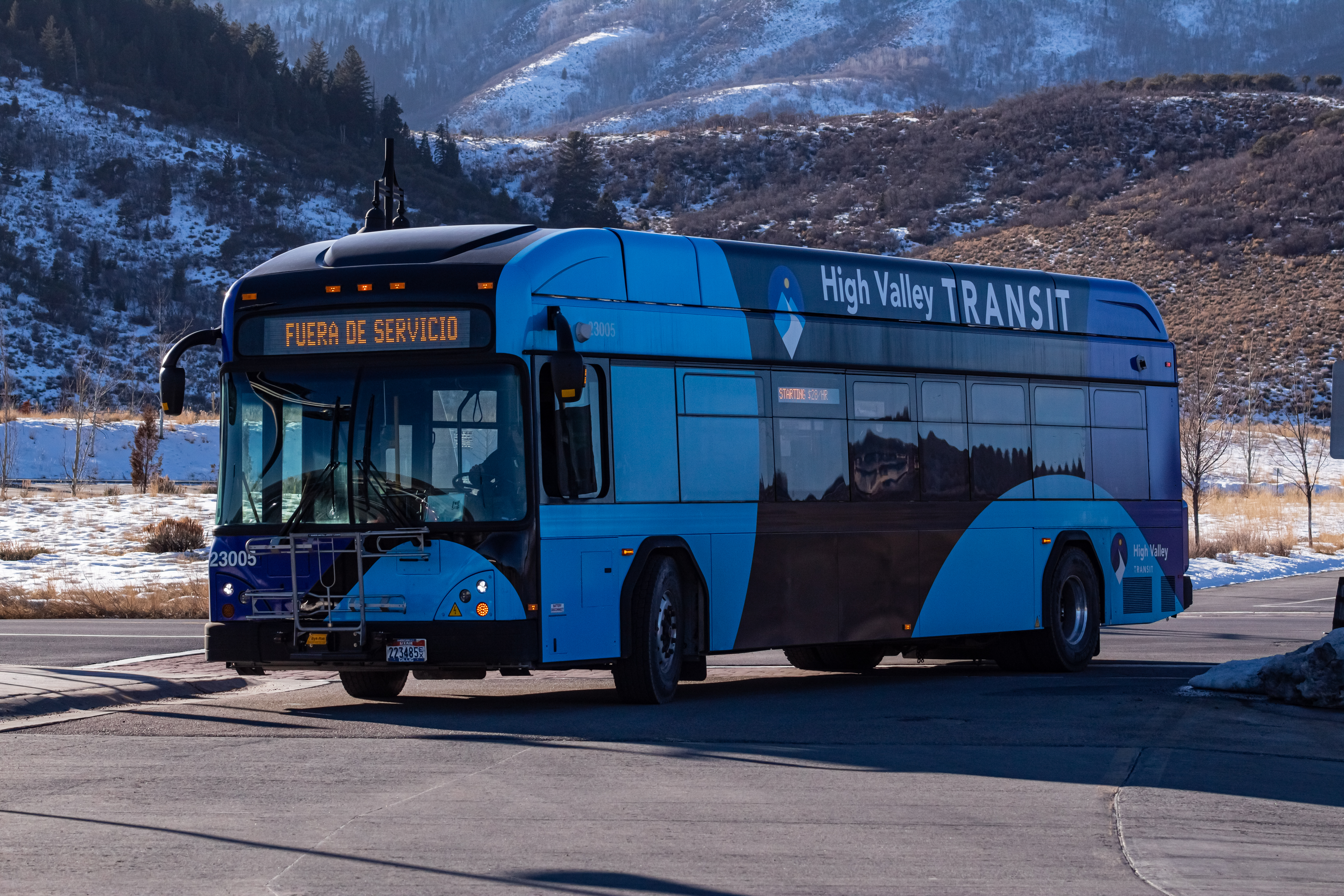
- High Valley Transit bus at the Kimball Junction Transit Center

Overview
- Area served: Summit County, Wasatch County
- Locale: Park City, Utah
- Transit type: Bus
- Annual ridership: 1,700,000 (bus); 560,000 (Microtransit)
- Chief executive: Caroline Rodriguez
- Website: hvtutah.gov

Operation
- Began operation: May 2021; 5 years ago
- Number of vehicles: 27 buses (Not including micro transit vehicles or minibuses)

High Valley Transit is an American transit agency located in the Summit and Wasatch counties of Utah. It operates throughout many different municipalities in the Wasatch Back, including Park City, Kamas, and Heber and provides fare-free service. The authority also provides a connection to the Salt Lake Valley via its 107 route. It operates fixed-route bus services and the region's first micro transit service, relying on an app to schedule bookings. High Valley Transit was created in 2021, after parts of Park City Transit were deemed largely inefficient in serving the greater Park City Area.

== History ==
High Valley Transit was established in 2021, as a solution to some areas of the Greater Park City Area being under served. On May 17, 2021, High Valley Transit started with its microtransit program, partnering with Via Transportation before launching fixed-route services on July 1. The transit authority acquired four Gillig diesel buses from Park City Transit, 680 and 630–33, becoming 10006 and 16007-16010 respectively. In August 2022, High Valley Transit started construction on a new transit depot in East Basin to accommodate the growing service, replacing the temporary tent near Ecker Hill Middle School. On December 11, 2022, High Valley Transit launched the 107 route to replace UTA's 901-902 routes. In the beginning of 2023, High Valley Transit acquired eight Gillig electric buses, aiming to test and use such buses in the winter of 2024. High Valley Transit also aims to take over operations of Park City's 10 White route on May 1, 2024.

== Transit centers ==
High Valley Transit operates and uses many transit centers in Northern Utah. Some stations include Salt Lake City Central, the Kimball Junction Transit Center, and the Old Town Transit Center. High Valley Transit also implements Neighborhood Newsfeeds by Soofa Digital at some of its transit hubs.

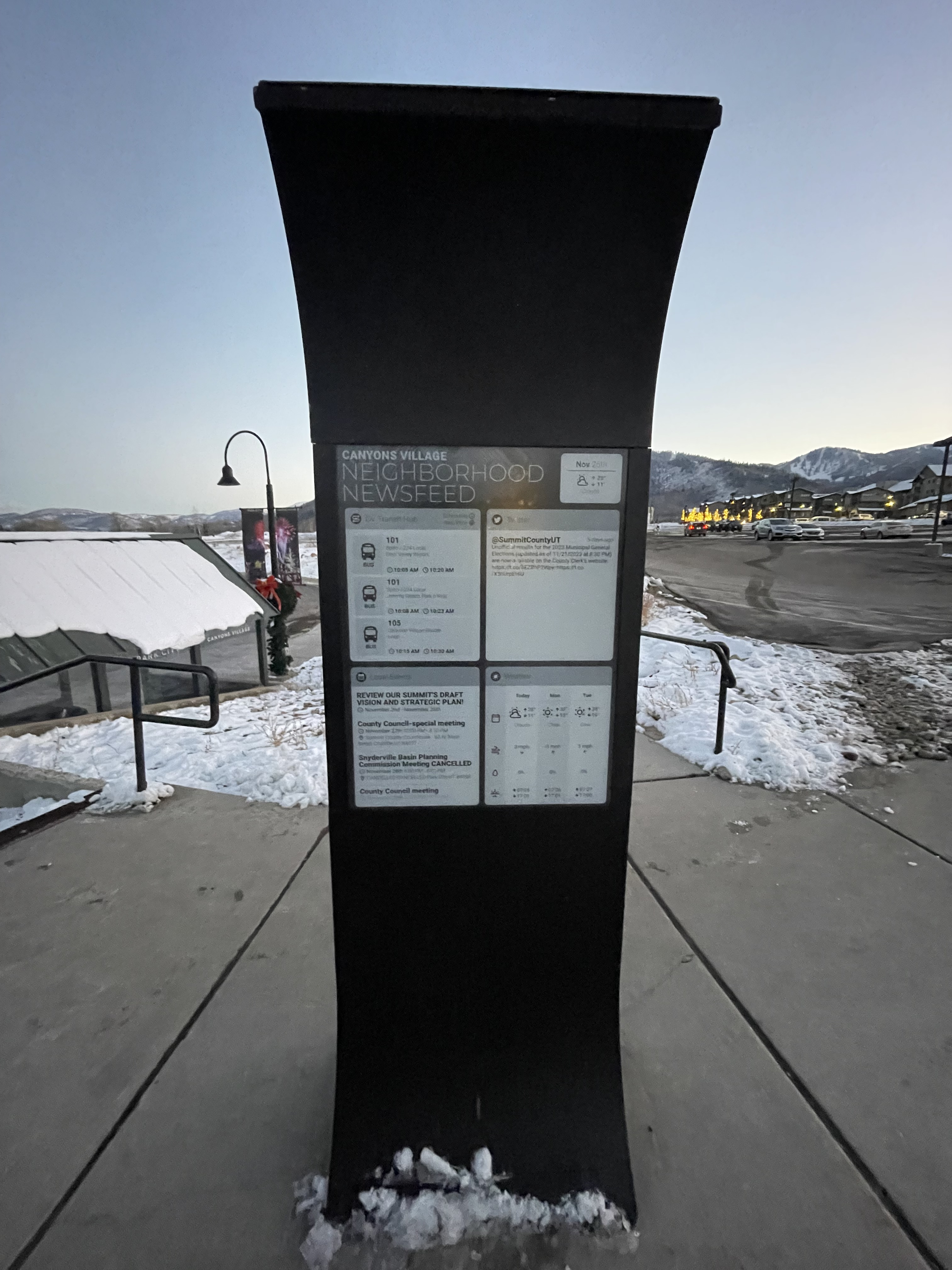
Neighborhood Newsfeed

=== Kimball Junction Transit Center ===
The Kimball Junction Transit Center is High Valley's main hub, serving the 101 Spiro, the 103 Kimball Junction Shuttle, the 107 Salt Lake Connector, and more. The Transit Center is also a terminus for the limited-service 10 White, operated by Park City Transit.

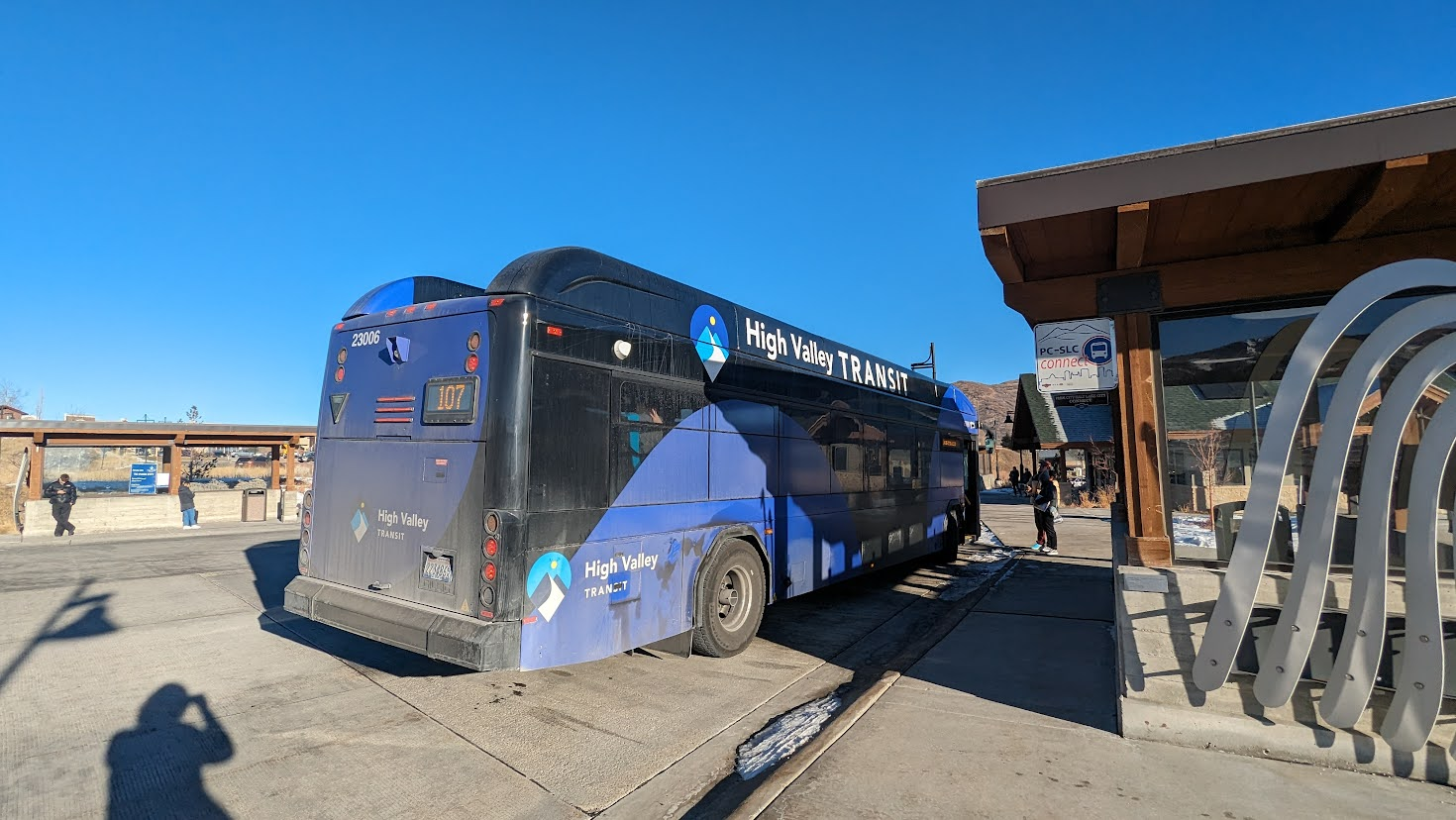
Kimball Junction Transit Hub

=== Old Town Transit Center ===
The Old Town Transit Center is the main transit hub for Park City, located near its historic Main Street. The hub is primarily used by Park City Transit, where all of its routes pass through the station. High Valley Transit's routes 101 and 102 pass through the Old Town Transit Center.

=== Salt Lake City Intermodal Hub ===
High Valley Transit connects to the Wasatch Front via the Salt Lake City Intermodal Hub, with its 107 Salt Lake Connector being the only route that connects Salt Lake City to High Valley's network. The Transit hub provides rail access to UTA's FrontRunner, Amtrak's California Zephyr, and UTA's Blue Line light rail service. The Salt Lake City Intermodal hub also provides connection to UTA's bus service.

== Microtransit ==
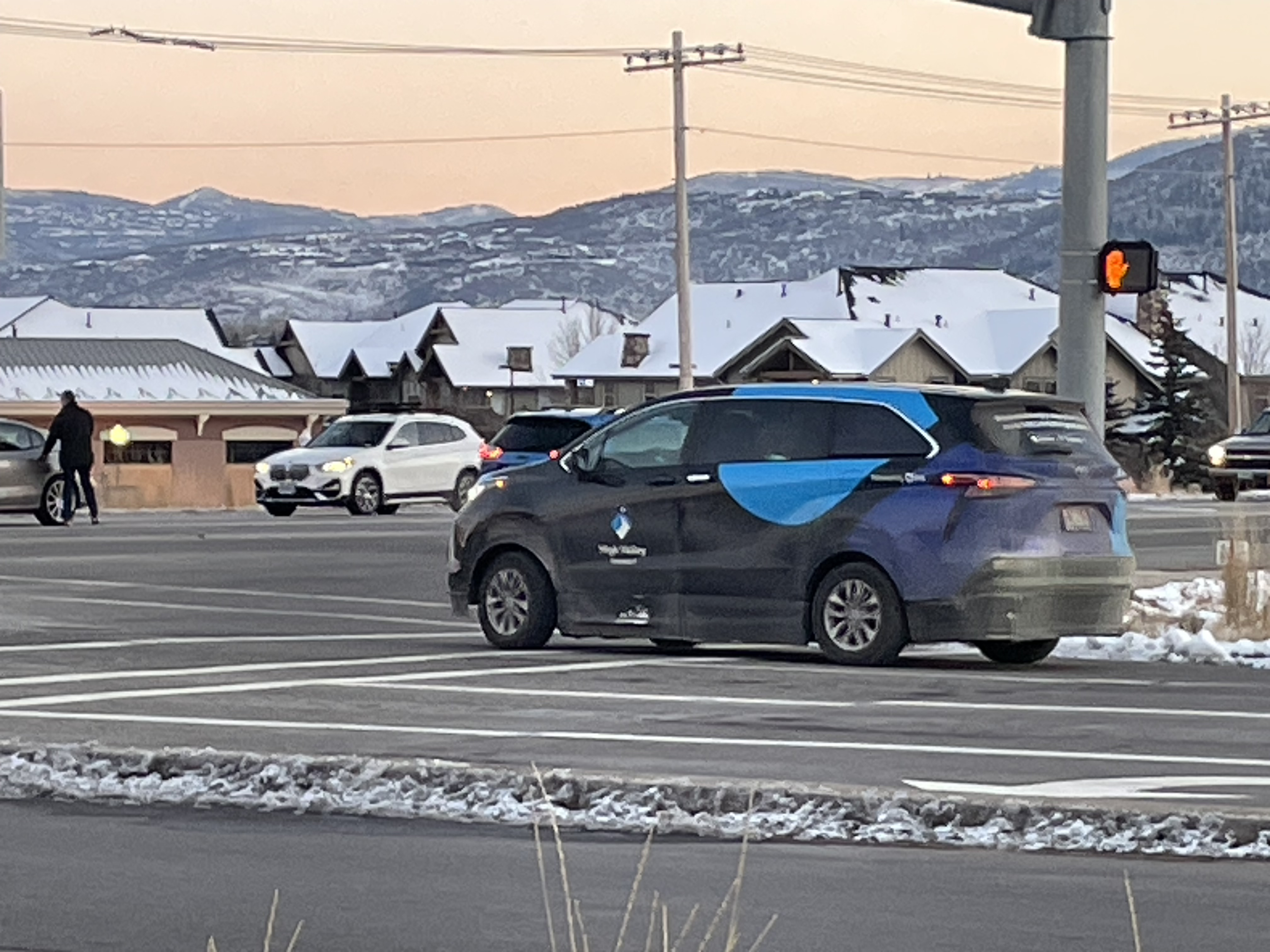
High Valley Transit minivan

Starting on May 17, 2021, High Valley Transit's microtransit service was the first of its kind in Utah. The program has since grown, with Park City contracting High Valley Transit's microtransit service since April 2023. In February 2024, High Valley Transit had 38,189 passengers that utilized its microtransit service. However, High Valley Transit's contract with Park City expired on April 15, 2021, with Park City's city council not renewing, citing long wait times and inefficient utilization.

== Routes ==
High Valley Transit operates ten bus routes throughout the Wasatch Back. Two commuter routes provide connections between Salt Lake City, Summit County, and Wasatch County.

| Route number | Terminal 1 | Terminal 2 | Notes |
|---|---|---|---|
| 101 Spiro/224 Local | Jeremy Ranch Park and Ride, Summit Park, UT | Deer Valley Resort Park City, Utah | Principal route of the network. Bus frequencies are usually 15-30 mins. |
| 102 Gateway/Kamas Commuter | Old Town Transit Center, Park City, UT | Francis, Utah | Six daily round trips. |
| 103 Kimball Junction Shuttle | Loop around Kimball Junction, UT | Loop around Kimball Junction, UT | Uses vans to transport passengers, loop around Kimball Junction. |
| 104 Bitner Shuttle | Kimball Junction Transit Center | Near the Canyon Creek Condos, Silver Summit, UT | Operated with cutaways. Frequency every fifteen minutes. |
| 105 Canyons Village Shuttle | Canyons Transit Hub, Snyderville UT | Canyons Resort and hotels, Snyderville, UT | Operated with cutaways. Frequency every 10–20 minutes. |
| 106 Wasatch Back Connector | Park Avenue Condos & Fresh Market, Park City UT | Heber Valley Hospital, Heber City, UT | 8 daily roundtrips. Connects with Microtransit in Heber. |
| 107 PC-SLC Connect | Kimball Junction Transit Center | Salt Lake City Central, Salt Lake City, UT | Replaced UTA Routes 901 and 902 in August 2023. ADA accessible as of December 10, 2023. Schedule adjusted effective May 11, 2026. |
| 108 Silver Creek Village | Jeremy Ranch Park and Ride, Summit Park, UT | Silver Creek Village | Operated with cutaways. |
| 10X Express - The High Line | Kimball Junction Transit Center | Old Town Transit Center, Park City UT | Formerly Park City Transit 10 White Express. |

== Fleet ==
| Bus Number | Make and Model | Year | Image | Notes |
|---|---|---|---|---|
| 9002, 9004, 9005, 9007, 9021, 9027-9029 | Gillig BRT 40' | 2009 | | Transferred from the Utah Transit Authority with the same fleet numbers. |
| 9001, 9003 | Gillig Low Floor 35' | 2009 | | |
| 10006 | Gillig Low Floor 35' | 2010 | | Originally was Bus 680 with Park City Transit |
| 10037 | Gillig BRT 40' | 2010 | | Transferred from Utah Transit Authority with same fleet number |
| 16007-16010 | Gillig BRT 35' | 2016 | | Originally were buses 630-633 with Park City transit respectively. 16010 Retired. |
| 21-101-21-102 | New Flyer XD-40 | 2021 | | |
| 22001-22004 | Gillig Low Floor Plus Electric 40' | 2022 | | Electric Buses ordered new. Comprises nearly 1/3 of High Valley Transit's fleet. |
| 23005-23008 | Gillig Low Floor Plus Electric 40' | 2023 | | Suburban configured with no rear door. |

In July 2024, High Valley Transit was awarded US$16.2 million in funding through the Federal Transit Administration's Low or No Emission Vehicle Program. The funding will support the procurement of 10 additional battery-electric buses, five depot chargers, and two on-route chargers. According to High Valley Transit, the project is expected to increase its planned battery-electric fleet from eight to 18 buses.

=== Retired Fleet ===
| Fleet number | Make & Model | Year | Image | Notes |
|---|---|---|---|---|
| 08001-08005 | New Flyer C40LF | 2008 | | Transferred from MTS in California. Old fleet numbers were 323, 325, 327, 329, and 331. CNG buses. |
| 7011-7013 | Gillig BRT 40' | 2007 | | All retired. Transferred from RTC-Washoe. |
