= Park City, Utah =

City in Utah, United States

- City
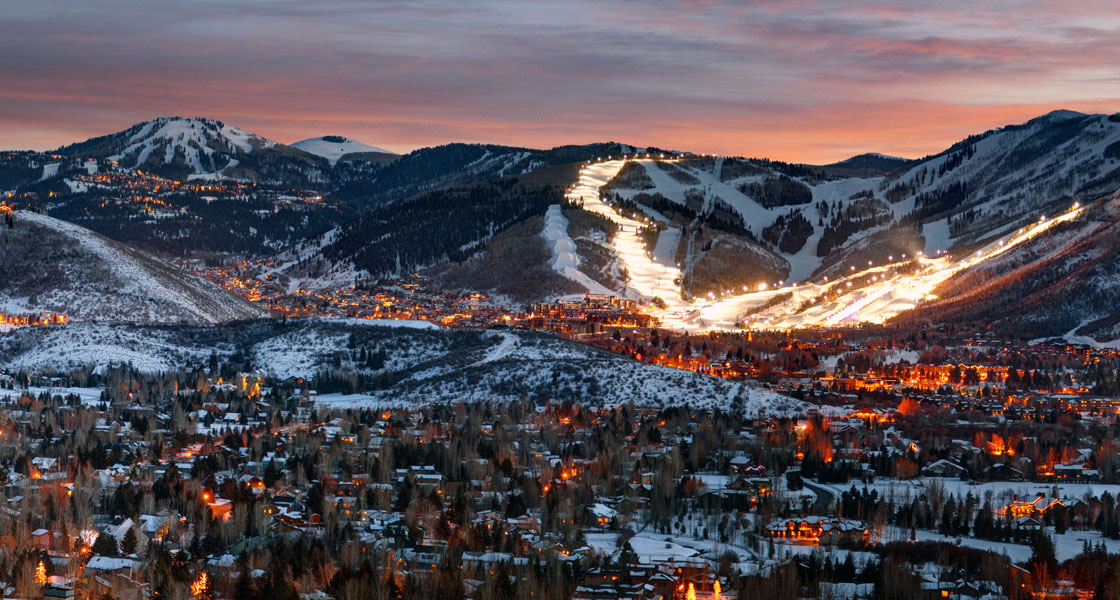
- Overlooking Park City in November 2013

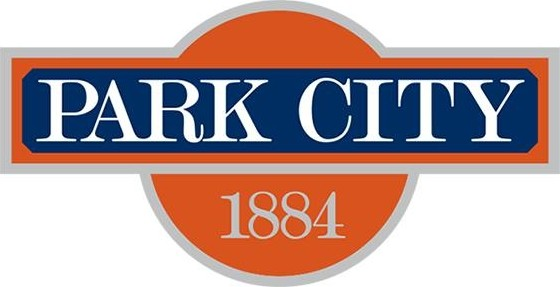
- Logo

- Location within Summit County and Utah
- Coordinates: 40°39′01″N 111°30′05″W
- Country: United States
- State: Utah
- County: Summit; Wasatch
- Founded: 1869
- Named for: Parley's Park

Government
  - Mayor: Ryan Dickey

Area
  - Total: 19.99 sq mi (51.77 km^{2})
  - Land: 19.98 sq mi (51.76 km^{2})
  - Water: 0.0039 sq mi (0.01 km^{2})
- Elevation: 6,936 ft (2,114 m)

Population (2020)
  - Total: 8,396
  - Density: 420.1/sq mi (162.21/km^{2})
- Time zone: UTC−7 (Mountain)
  - Summer (DST): UTC−6 (Mountain)
- ZIP Codes: 84060, 84068, 84098
- Area code: 435
- FIPS code: 49-58070
- GNIS feature ID: 2411372
- Website: parkcity.gov

Park City is a city in Utah, United States. Most of the city is within Summit County, with some portions extending into Wasatch County. It is considered to be part of the Wasatch Back. The population was 8,396 at the 2020 census, and on average, the tourist population greatly exceeds the number of permanent residents. The city is 32 miles (51 km) southeast of downtown Salt Lake City and 20 miles (32 km) from Salt Lake City's east edge of Sugar House along Interstate 80.

After a population decline following the shutdown of the area's mining industry, the city rebounded during the 1980s and 1990s through an expansion of its tourism business. According to 2021 data, the city brought in a yearly average of $529.8 million to the Utah economy as a tourist hot spot, $80 million of which was attributed to the Sundance Film Festival. The city has two major ski resorts: Deer Valley Resort and Park City Mountain Resort (combined with Canyons Village at Park City) and one minor resort: Woodward Park City (an action sports training and fun center). Both Deer Valley and Park City Mountain Resorts were the major locations for ski and snowboarding events at the 2002 Winter Olympics, and are expected to reprise these roles for the 2034 Winter Olympics. Although they receive less snow and have a shorter ski season than do their counterparts in Salt Lake County, such as Snowbird resort, they are much easier to access.

In 2015, Park City Ski Resort and Canyons resorts merged, creating the largest ski area in the U.S. In all, the resort boasts 17 slopes, 14 bowls, 300 trails and 22 miles (35 km) of lifts.

The city was the original location of the United States' largest independent film festival, the Sundance Film Festival, which was held in the city for 48 years, with Park City still currently serving as the headquarters of the Sundance Institute's Utah office; home of the United States Ski Team; training center for members of the Australian Freestyle Ski Team; the largest collection of factory outlet stores in northern Utah; the 2002 Olympic bobsled/skeleton/luge track at the Utah Olympic Park; and golf courses. Some scenes from the 1994 film Dumb and Dumber were shot in the city. Outdoor-oriented businesses such as backcountry.com, Rossignol USA, and Skullcandy have their headquarters in Park City. The city has many retailers, clubs, bars, and restaurants, and has nearby reservoirs, hot springs, forests, and hiking and biking trails.

In the summertime, many valley residents of the Wasatch Front visit the town to escape high temperatures. Park City is usually cooler than Salt Lake City as it lies mostly higher than 7,000 feet (2,100 m) above sea level, while Salt Lake City is situated at an elevation of about 4,300 feet (1,300 m).

== History ==
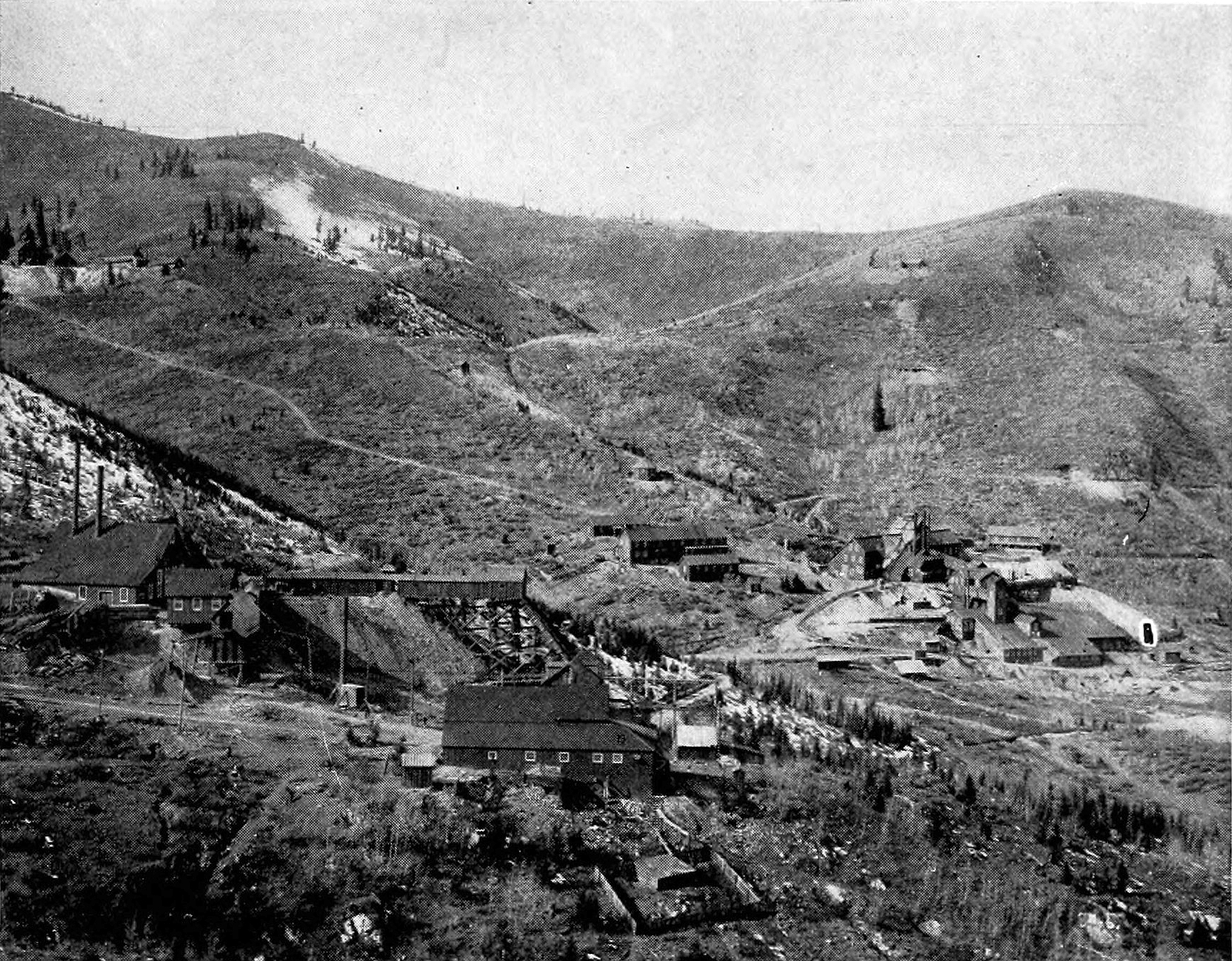
Daly West and Quincy Mines in Park City (1911)

The area was traveled by the early Mormon pioneers on their journey to where they settled and built Salt Lake City. One of their leaders, Parley P. Pratt, explored the canyon in 1848. He was given a charter the following year to build a toll road through it, which was finished in 1849. The basin at the top of the canyon was an ideal place to graze, and a few families settled. Early on, the area was deeded to Samuel Snyder, Heber C. Kimball and Jedediah Grant. The settlers named it "Parley's Park City", which was shortened to "Park City" upon the town's incorporation in 1884. The first known discovery of ore in this area was by men serving under Colonel Patrick E. Connor, who invited his men to prospect in the area after having been relocated from Gold Rush–era California. The finding of silver, gold, and lead sparked the first silver mines in Park City in the 1860s. Park City's large mining boom brought large crowds of prospectors setting up camps around the mountain terrain, marking the first mining settlements. Although it was not the first find, the Ontario silver mine, discovered by Herman Buden in 1872 and quickly purchased by George Hearst through his business partner R. C. Chambers, was the first major producer.

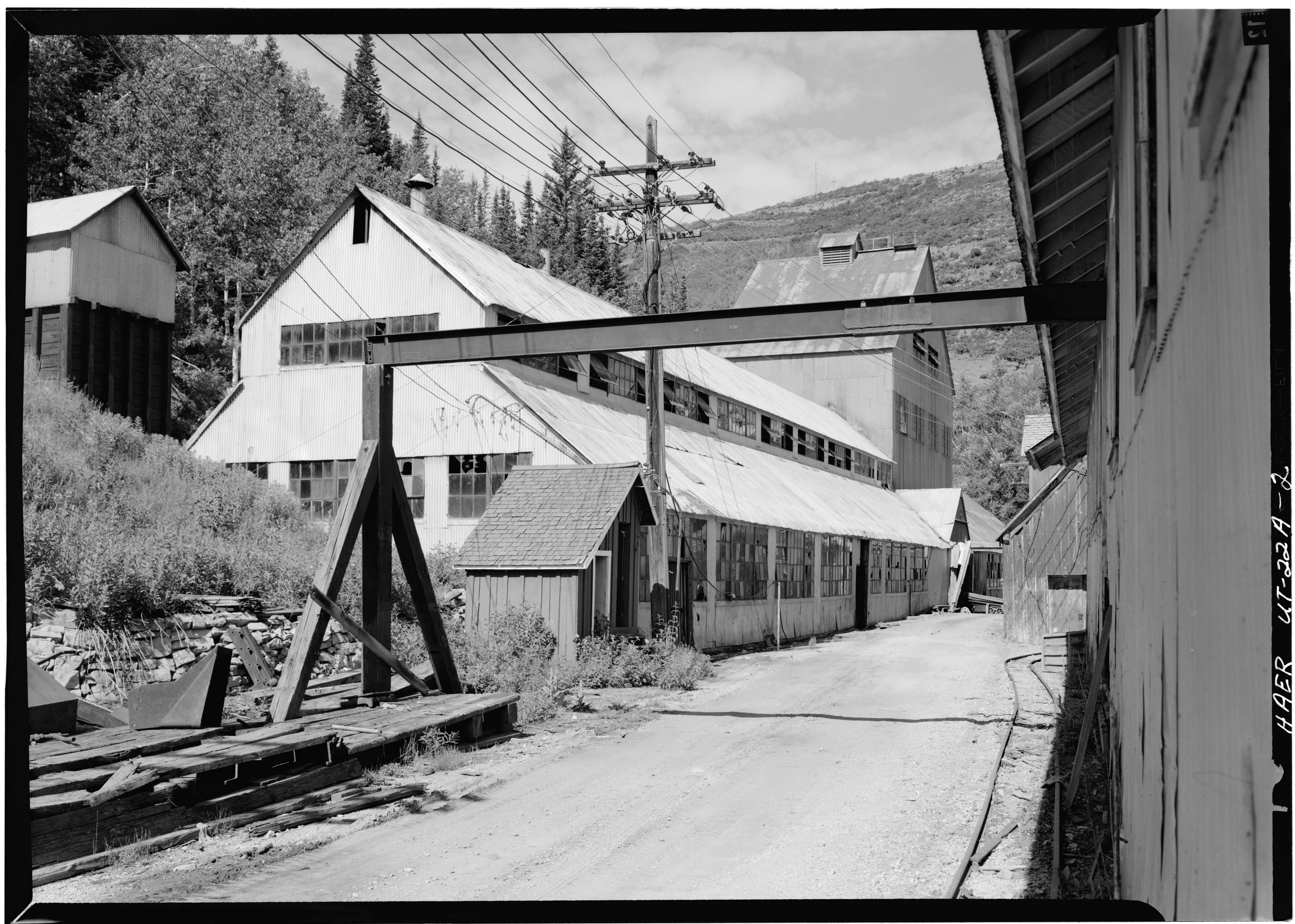
The Silver King Coalition mine was once the world's richest. Photo by Jack Boucher (1971).

Another prominent mining family was that of William Montague Ferry Jr. Ferry moved to Utah from West Michigan already a very wealthy man. He had previously been a colonel in the Union Army, mayor of Grand Haven, and was son of wealthy businessman William Montague Ferry. Ferry was followed by a group of other wealthy Michiganders (including his brother Edward Payson Ferry) who came to be the social elites of the town. The Ferry family owned numerous mines, including the Marsac Silver mining Company and the Silver King Coalition Mines. Col. Ferry also donated the land for Westminster College and unsuccessfully ran for governor of Utah. Edward Ferry's son W. Mont Ferry was mayor of Salt Lake City.

In 1880, a spur line was established to the Echo station of the first transcontinental railroad. By 1892 the Silver King Mine and its owners Thomas Kearns and David Keith took the spotlight as one of the most famous silver mines in the world. While silver mines were doing well in Utah, other mines around the world were not doing as well, which drew many of these miners to Park City. The town flourished with crowds of miners and wealth, but by the 1950s, the town nearly became a ghost town. This was due in part to a drop in the price of silver.

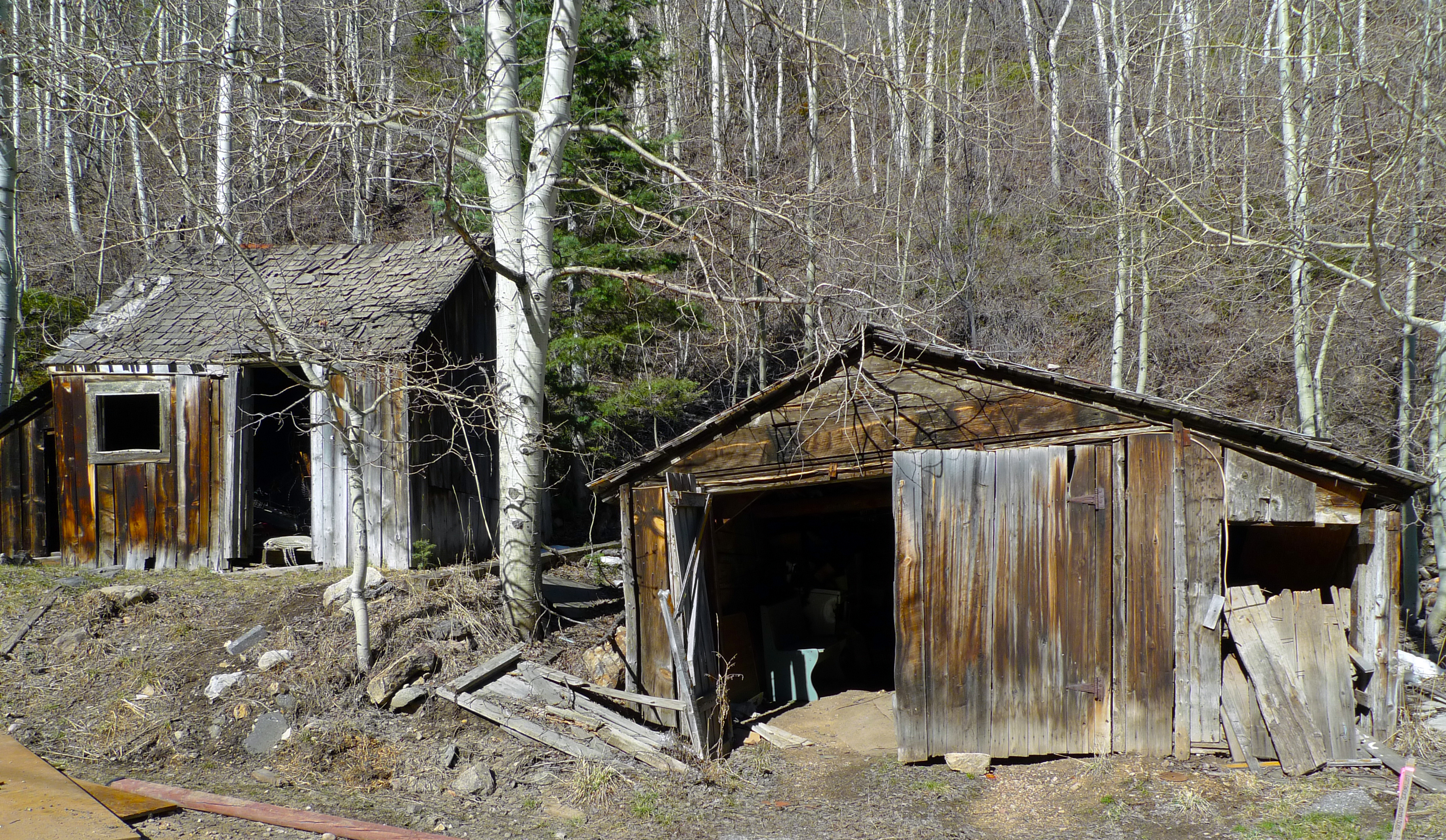
Historical wood cabin in Park City

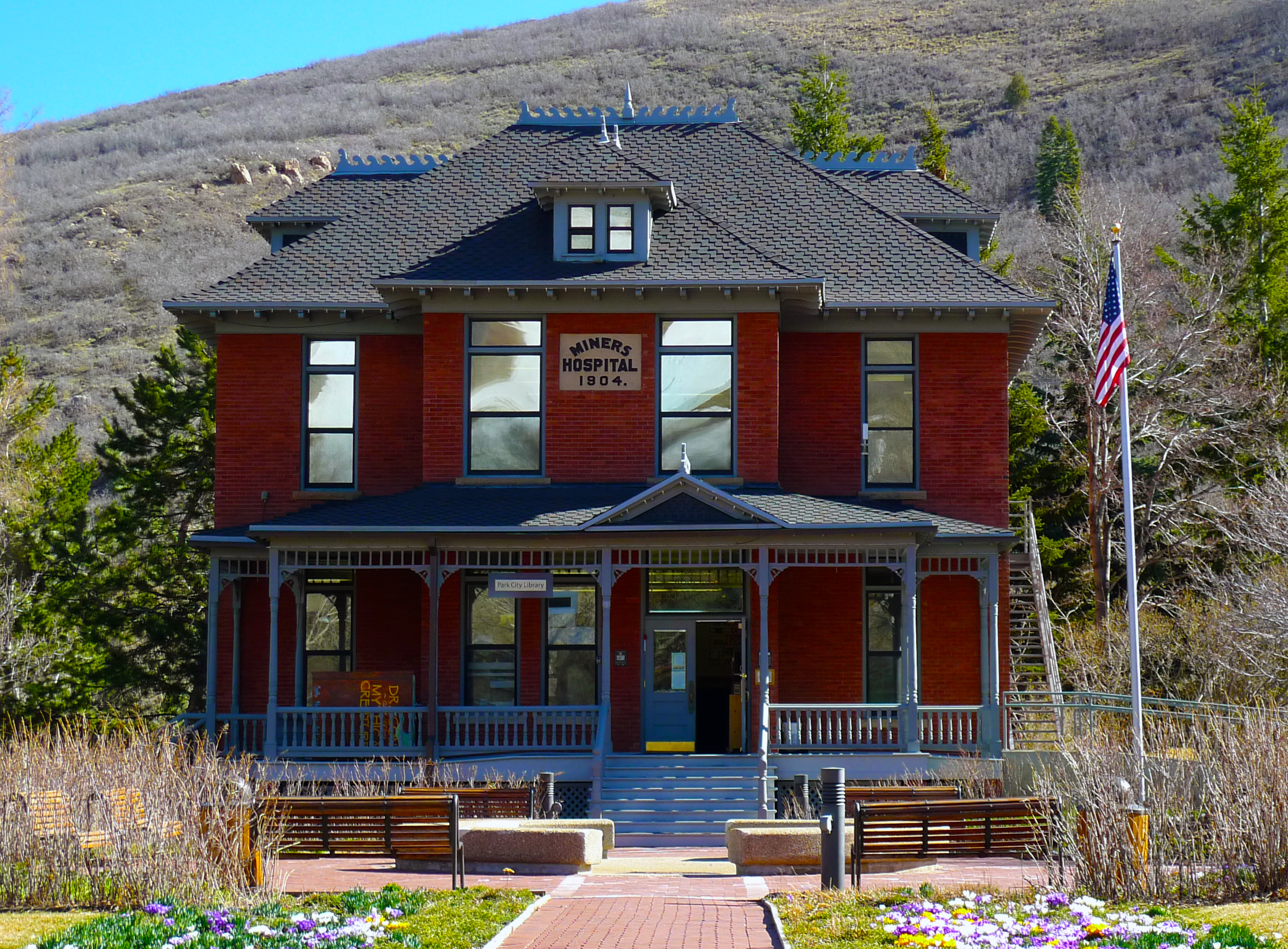
Historic Miners Hospital in Park City

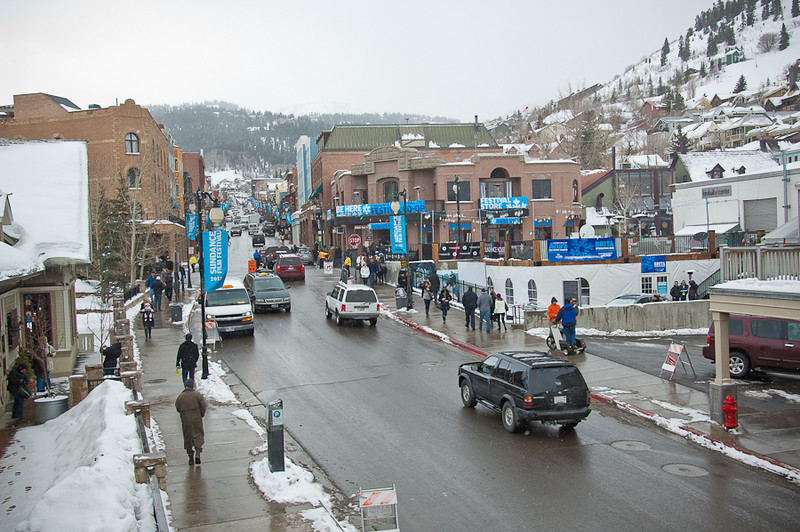
Main Street

The town was nearly destroyed by fire in 1898. Another accident occurred in 1902 when 34 miners were killed in an explosion in the Daly West Mine.

The transformation of Park City into a ski destination town is primarily attributed to declining silver and metal prices during and following World War I, the Great Depression, and World War II. The mining community never fully recovered and so the town turned to skiing. The silver industry was suffering when 'Parkite' miners presented to Utahns Inc. a proposal for a ski resort called Treasure Mountain. United Park City Mines, who owned the land the resort would be built on, received a land-redevelopment grant from the John F. Kennedy Administration. Treasure Mountains (now Park City Mountain Resort) opened in 1963 on 10,000 acres (40 km^{2}) of land the miners owned with mineral rights. This is said to be when tourists first largely began to visit Park City. This marks the beginning of the ski industry largely promoted by the Utah State Legislation as a destination resort.

Since the rise of the skiing and tourist economy, Park City houses more tourists than residents. It has become a place of fame through the 2002 Winter Olympic Games and provides more attractions than ever before. In the 1950s, Utah began to use Park City as a mountain getaway, and not until D. James Canon promoted winter sports in Utah, with the promotional scheme of "Ski Utah" and "The Greatest Snow on Earth" did many drive to see the city. Utah drew in over 648,000 tourists in 1970 and now a yearly average of 4 million tourists. In a town with a population of 8,000, the average number of tourists in Park City is 600,000 per year. This significant increase in visitors could be credited to promotional material that is distributed by the Utah Publicity and Tourist Council. Growth has accelerated in the last few decades, and Park City is now one of the most affluent resort towns in the United States.

According to the Bureau of Economic and Business Research, in 2012 travel, tourism and recreation generated $7.4 billion in spending and $960.6 million in state and local tax revenue for the State of Utah. That same year Utah's total gross domestic product was $128 billion, making tourism 5.8% of GDP for the Utah economy as a whole. Park City draws in 3,006,071 average annual visitors; in the winter 1,603,775, and in the summer 1,402,296. Park City benefits from the average nightly visitor spending $100 to $350. Currently, Park City primarily relies on its tourist industry from skiing to restaurants to hiking and biking. The makeover of Park City has stimulated a culture of expenditure, adventure, wealth, and this is included in their promotional material.

To this day, there are still more than 1,000 miles (1,600 km) of old silver-mine workings and tunnels beneath the slopes at Park City Mountain Resort and neighboring Deer Valley. On Main Street, 64 Victorian buildings are listed in the National Register of Historic Places. There are many remaining mine buildings, mine shafts (most blocked off from outsiders with large steel doors), and hoists, including the weathered remains of the California-Comstock and Silver King Mines and the water towers once used to hydrate one of the biggest mines, the Silver King, provide some history of this mining town transformed into a skiing resort.

In 2011, the town was awarded a Gold-level Ride Center designation from the International Mountain Bicycling Association for its mountain bike trails, amenities and community. Park City Municipal, along with Basin Recreation manage bike trails in Park City.

== Geography ==
Aerial view of Park City, Utah, on a winter evening (15 seconds, 17.46 MB)

According to the United States Census Bureau, the city has a total area of 17.567 square miles (45.50 km^{2}), all land.

Park City is located at the south end of Snyderville Basin and climbs steep mountains to the southeast, south, and west. It is accessed by State Route 224 from Interstate 80 to the north and State Route 248 (Kearns Boulevard), which heads east to U.S. Route 40 and on to Kamas.

From Park City north through the Snyderville Basin there is a low topographic divide with McLeod Creek on the western side and Silver Creek on the eastern side.

=== Climate ===
Summers in Park City are warm with cool nights, while winters are cold and snowy. The city has a humid continental climate (Köppen: Dfb), though higher elevations within city limits may experience a subalpine (Dfc) or alpine (ET) climate. The diurnal temperature variation is considerably higher in summer than winter.

Climate data for Park City, Utah, 1991–2020 normals, extremes 1896–present
| Month | Jan | Feb | Mar | Apr | May | Jun | Jul | Aug | Sep | Oct | Nov | Dec | Year |
|---|---|---|---|---|---|---|---|---|---|---|---|---|---|
| Record high °F (°C) | 64 (18) | 62 (17) | 71 (22) | 86 (30) | 91 (33) | 101 (38) | 100 (38) | 95 (35) | 91 (33) | 82 (28) | 71 (22) | 62 (17) | 101 (38) |
| Mean maximum °F (°C) | 48.1 (8.9) | 50.3 (10.2) | 59.5 (15.3) | 69.1 (20.6) | 77.8 (25.4) | 85.4 (29.7) | 90.3 (32.4) | 87.7 (30.9) | 82.9 (28.3) | 72.6 (22.6) | 60.4 (15.8) | 49.3 (9.6) | 90.5 (32.5) |
| Mean daily maximum °F (°C) | 32.7 (0.4) | 34.9 (1.6) | 43.0 (6.1) | 51.0 (10.6) | 61.1 (16.2) | 72.4 (22.4) | 80.4 (26.9) | 78.4 (25.8) | 68.8 (20.4) | 56.0 (13.3) | 42.2 (5.7) | 33.1 (0.6) | 54.5 (12.5) |
| Daily mean °F (°C) | 24.1 (−4.4) | 25.9 (−3.4) | 34.2 (1.2) | 41.0 (5.0) | 49.5 (9.7) | 59.1 (15.1) | 66.6 (19.2) | 65.1 (18.4) | 55.8 (13.2) | 44.7 (7.1) | 32.8 (0.4) | 24.6 (−4.1) | 43.6 (6.5) |
| Mean daily minimum °F (°C) | 15.6 (−9.1) | 16.9 (−8.4) | 25.4 (−3.7) | 31.1 (−0.5) | 37.9 (3.3) | 45.7 (7.6) | 52.9 (11.6) | 51.8 (11.0) | 42.8 (6.0) | 33.3 (0.7) | 23.3 (−4.8) | 16.1 (−8.8) | 32.7 (0.4) |
| Mean minimum °F (°C) | −4.7 (−20.4) | −3.1 (−19.5) | 6.0 (−14.4) | 15.6 (−9.1) | 23.8 (−4.6) | 31.2 (−0.4) | 39.9 (4.4) | 38.4 (3.6) | 26.7 (−2.9) | 16.8 (−8.4) | 2.5 (−16.4) | −2.7 (−19.3) | −8.5 (−22.5) |
| Record low °F (°C) | −28 (−33) | −28 (−33) | −23 (−31) | −4 (−20) | 12 (−11) | 11 (−12) | 21 (−6) | 20 (−7) | 8 (−13) | 6 (−14) | −11 (−24) | −30 (−34) | −30 (−34) |
| Average precipitation inches (mm) | 2.25 (57) | 1.82 (46) | 1.83 (46) | 2.17 (55) | 2.22 (56) | 1.38 (35) | 1.02 (26) | 1.44 (37) | 1.81 (46) | 2.35 (60) | 2.05 (52) | 2.05 (52) | 22.39 (568) |
| Average snowfall inches (cm) | 26.6 (68) | 22.2 (56) | 15.5 (39) | 10.0 (25) | 2.3 (5.8) | 0.2 (0.51) | 0.0 (0.0) | 0.0 (0.0) | 0.5 (1.3) | 3.2 (8.1) | 17.4 (44) | 23.3 (59) | 121.2 (306.71) |
| Average extreme snow depth inches (cm) | 21.6 (55) | 22.9 (58) | 16.4 (42) | 3.7 (9.4) | 0.3 (0.76) | 0.0 (0.0) | 0.0 (0.0) | 0.0 (0.0) | 0.4 (1.0) | 1.8 (4.6) | 6.6 (17) | 14.3 (36) | 27.4 (70) |
| Average precipitation days (≥ 0.01 in) | 9.1 | 8.7 | 8.0 | 9.2 | 7.3 | 5.4 | 5.3 | 8.6 | 6.1 | 8.7 | 8.5 | 9.8 | 94.7 |
| Average snowy days (≥ 0.1 in) | 9.5 | 7.2 | 5.7 | 4.3 | 1.4 | 0.2 | 0.0 | 0.0 | 0.3 | 1.7 | 5.7 | 7.7 | 43.7 |
Source: NOAA

== Demographics ==
Historical population
| Census | Pop. | Note | %± |
|---|---|---|---|
| 1870 | 164 | | — |
| 1880 | 1,542 | | 840.2% |
| 1890 | 2,850 | | 84.8% |
| 1900 | 3,759 | | 31.9% |
| 1910 | 3,439 | | −8.5% |
| 1920 | 3,393 | | −1.3% |
| 1930 | 4,281 | | 26.2% |
| 1940 | 3,739 | | −12.7% |
| 1950 | 2,254 | | −39.7% |
| 1960 | 1,366 | | −39.4% |
| 1970 | 1,193 | | −12.7% |
| 1980 | 2,823 | | 136.6% |
| 1990 | 4,468 | | 58.3% |
| 2000 | 7,341 | | 64.3% |
| 2010 | 7,558 | | 3.0% |
| 2020 | 8,396 | | 11.1% |

=== 2020 census ===
As of the 2020 census, Park City had a population of 8,396. The median age was 43.7 years. 18.7% of residents were under the age of 18 and 17.3% of residents were 65 years of age or older. For every 100 females there were 106.0 males, and for every 100 females age 18 and over there were 105.3 males age 18 and over.

94.1% of residents lived in urban areas, while 5.9% lived in rural areas.

There were 3,467 households in Park City, of which 26.2% had children under the age of 18 living in them. Of all households, 51.6% were married-couple households, 20.6% were households with a male householder and no spouse or partner present, and 22.1% were households with a female householder and no spouse or partner present. About 26.0% of all households were made up of individuals and 8.6% had someone living alone who was 65 years of age or older.

There were 8,127 housing units, of which 57.3% were vacant. The homeowner vacancy rate was 2.6% and the rental vacancy rate was 18.9%.

Racial composition as of the 2020 census
| Race | Number | Percentage |
|---|---|---|
| White | 6,379 | 76.0% |
| Black or African American | 57 | 0.7% |
| American Indian and Alaska Native | 28 | 0.3% |
| Asian | 241 | 2.9% |
| Native Hawaiian and Other Pacific Islander | 9 | 0.1% |
| Some other race | 961 | 11.4% |
| Two or more races | 721 | 8.6% |
| Hispanic or Latino (of any race) | 1,623 | 19.3% |

=== 2010 census ===
As of the census of 2010, there were 7,558 people, 2,885 households, and 1,742 families residing in the city. The population density was 430.2 inhabitants per square mile (166.1/km^{2}). There were 9,471 housing units at an average density of 539.1 per square mile (208.1/km^{2}). The racial makeup of the city was 81.0% White, 0.6% African American, 0.30% Native American, 2.1% Asian, 0.3% Pacific Islander, 13.5% from other races, and 2.3% from two or more races. Hispanic or Latino residents of any race were 24.1% of the population.

There were 2,885 households, out of which 26.8% had children under the age of 18 living with them, 48.4% were married couples living together, 7.3% had a female householder with no husband present, 2.6% had a male householder with no wife present, and 39.6% were non-families. Of all households 25.8% were made up of individuals, and 5.0% had someone living alone who was 65 years of age or older. The average household size was 2.6 and the average family size was 3.03.

The age distribution was 23.0% under the age of 20, 7.2% from 20 to 24, 30.7% from 25 to 44, 30.4% from 45 to 64, and 8.5% who were 65 years of age or older. The median age was 37.4 years. For every 100 females, there were 112.3 males. For every 100 females age 18 and over, there were 114.7 males.

=== 2000 census ===
As of the census of 2000, the median income for a household in the city was $65,800, and the median income for a family was $77,137. Males had a median income of $40,032 versus $26,341 for females. The per capita income for the city was $45,164. About 5.3% of families and 10.0% of the population were below the poverty line, including 11.6% of those under age 18 and 6.6% of those age 65 or over.

== Arts and culture ==
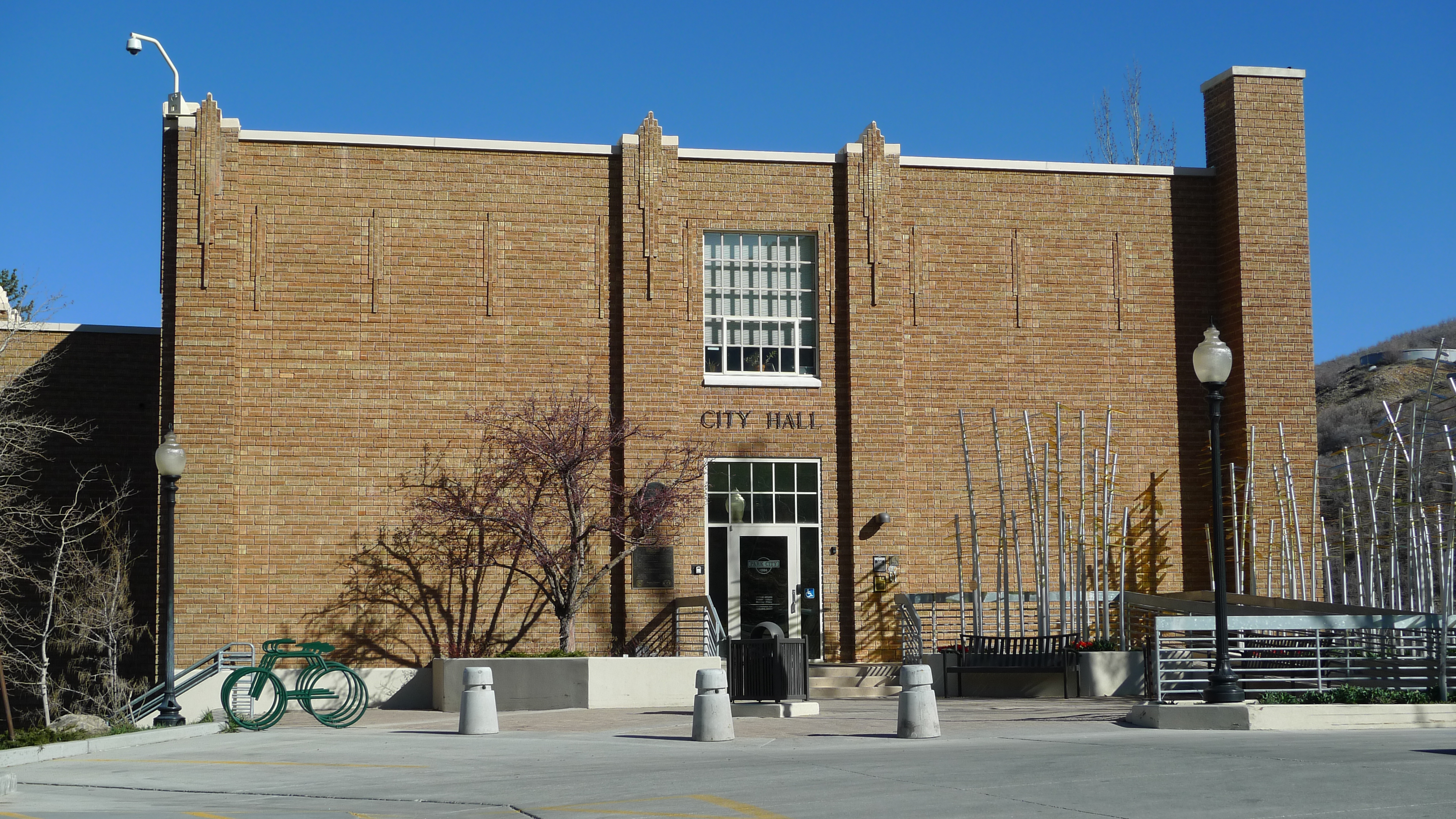
City Hall

=== Attractions ===
Park City is home to Park City Mountain Resort, Canyons Village at Park City, Deer Valley Resort, Woodward Park City, the Utah Olympic Park (including the Alf Engen Ski Museum and Eccles Salt Lake 2002 Olympic Winter Games Museum), the Park City Museum, the Eccles Center Theater, an outlet mall, Main Street shopping and dining, and hundreds of miles of hiking and biking trails. The four resorts and Olympic Park offer activities and attractions in both the summer and winter.

=== Events ===
From 1978 until 2026, Park City hosted the Sundance Film Festival. The festivities were centered on Main Street, while film screenings are held in several venues both within and outside of Park City. After 2026, the festival will relocate to Boulder, Colorado. However, Park City will still maintain its status as the home of the Sundance Institute's Utah office. Park City hosts an art festival each year, the Kimball Arts Festival, which typically attracts around 50,000 visitors. Park City also hosts two parades each year, one on July Fourth that attracts visitors from all over Utah, and one on Labor Day (locally called Miners' Day) that is more local-oriented. Park City co-hosted the 2002 Winter Olympics with Salt Lake City, and usually serves as the finish for the final leg of the Tour of Utah road bike race.

== Education ==
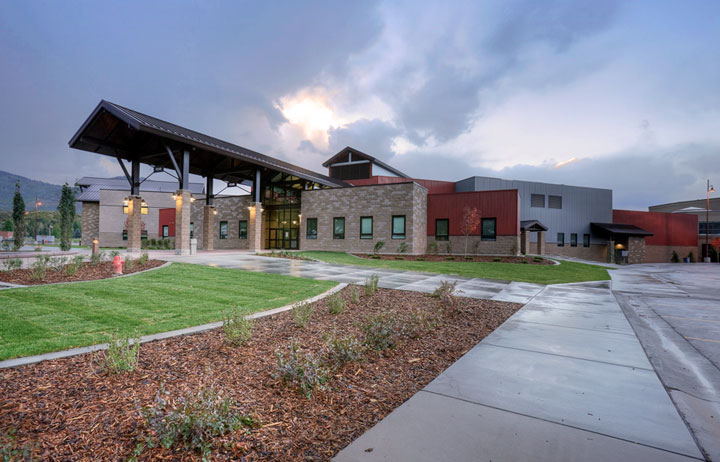
Park City High School

Park City School District is the local school district of the portion of Park City in Summit County (almost all of Park City).

Park City High School is located at 1750 Kearns Blvd, Park City, Utah. Park City School District's size is comparable to other Utah school districts, with more than 4,500 students. It is also close to the state average ethnic minority composition. Of its students 17% are ethnic minorities—mostly of Hispanic heritage. The school provides its students with a series of film and TV production classes, and hosts "The Miner Film Festival" each year for students to enter their films and show them at the Eccles Center.

The portion of the city that is in Wasatch County is served by the Wasatch School District.

The Park City Library is also located in Park City, Utah, and features various attractions.

Park City is home to the Swaner EcoCenter, which also serves as an extension and distance education center for Utah State University.

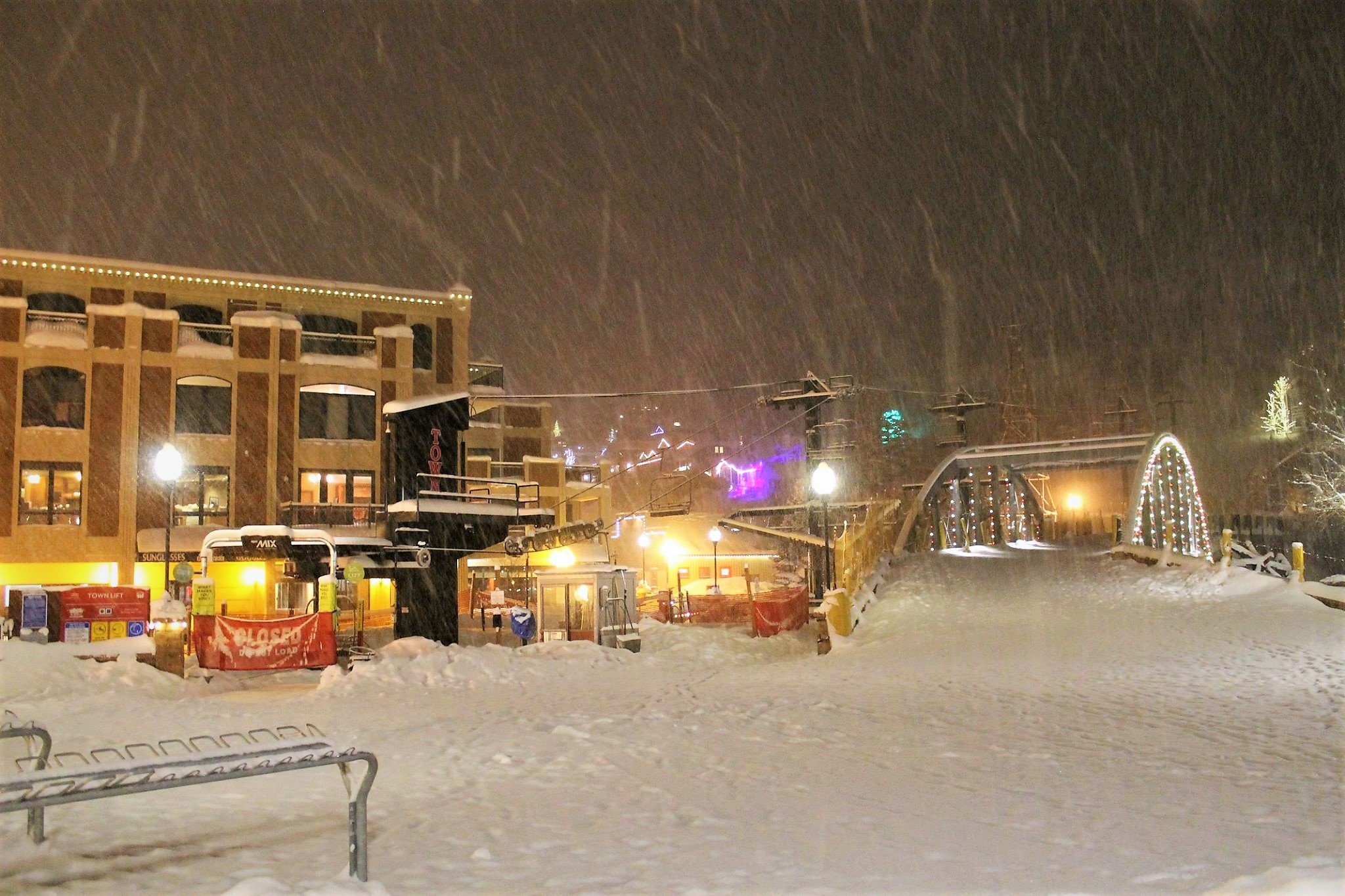
Park City includes access to Park City Resort with Town Lift

== Public transit ==
Park City operates its own free intra-city transit system (with additional service to limited areas of Summit and Wasatch County northeast of town provided by High Valley Transit). Routes include service to the Canyons Village, Deer Valley Resort, Empire Pass, Jeremy Ranch Park & Ride lot, Kimball Junction, Park City Resort, Park Meadows, Pinebrook, Prospector Square, Silver Lake Village, Silver Springs, Silver Summit/Highland Estates, and Thaynes Canyon. Bus service is offered between Park City and Salt Lake City via High Valley Transit's route 107.

== Media ==
Park City is served by The Park Record (the oldest continually published non-daily paper in Utah, and one of the oldest in the U.S.), TownLift (online news), and KPCW (a local NPR news/radio affiliate).

== Notable people ==
- Haley Batten: professional cross-country mountain biker and Olympian
- Ken Block: DC Shoes founder, rally car driver, founder of Hoonigan and Gymkhana Grid
- Lia Block: F1 Academy and Williams Driver Academy driver, daughter of Ken Block
- Rosie Brennan: 2018 Olympic cross-country skier
- Ashley Caldwell: 2010, 2014, and 2018 Olympic freestyle skier
- Brett Camerota: 2010 Olympic silver medalist in team Nordic combined
- Joss Christensen: first Olympic gold medalist in ski Slopestyle in 2014
- Jade Chynoweth: actress and dancer
- Virginia Cutler: educator
- Casey Dawson: 2022 Olympic bronze medalist in men's team pursuit speedskating
- Gregg Deal: Artist
- Bill Demong: 2010 Olympic gold and silver medalist in individual and team Nordic combined
- Dusty Dvorak: 1984 Olympic gold medalist volleyball; inducted into Volleyball Hall of Fame in 1998
- Mark Eaton: professional basketball player for Utah Jazz
- Bill Engvall: Blue Collar Comedy Tour comedian
- Stein Eriksen: 1952 Olympic gold and silver medalist in Alpine skiing; freestyle skiing innovator
- Bud Feltman: 1964 Olympian in luge; former Vice President of Scott USA and Smith USA
- Edward Payson Ferry: Mining magnate, Park City settler
- William Montague Ferry Jr.: Politician, mining magnate, philanthropist, and Park City settler
- Brandon Flowers: Award-winning lead singer of The Killers and solo artist
- Edward J. Fraughton: sculptor, Inventor
- John W. Gallivan: publisher of The Salt Lake Tribune from 1960 to 1984
- Alex Hall: Winter X Games gold medalist and a participant in the 2018 Winter Olympics as a freestyle skier
- Tanner Hall: Freeskier and multiple Winter X Games medalist as a freestyle skier
- Phil L. Hansen: former Utah attorney general
- William Jefferson Hardin: black legislator
- George Hearst: mining entrepreneur, U.S. Senator, and founder of what became the Hearst Corporation news dynasty
- Eric Heiden: winner of all five individual speed skating gold medals at 1980 Olympics
- Sarah Hendrickson: 2014 and 2018 Olympic ski jumper; was the first woman in an Olympic Games
- Steven Holcomb: U.S. Bobsled Team at the 2010 Winter Olympics and gold medalist in the 4-man bobsled event.
- Whitney Jensen: ballet dancer
- Jessica Jerome: 2014 Olympic ski jumper; was the first woman to qualify for an Olympic Games in the event.
- Thomas Kearns: U.S. Senator 1883–1918, owner of Silver King Coalition Mining Co.
- Sage Kotsenburg: first Olympic gold medalist in Snowboard Slopestyle in 2014
- Ted Ligety: 2006 and 2014 Olympic gold medalist in Alpine skiing
- Alli Macuga: freestyle skier
- Lauren Macuga: alpine skier
- Sam Macuga: ski jumper
- Mike Massey: professional pocket billiards (pool) player
- Danny Masterson: actor, best known as Hyde from That '70s Show
- Roger I. McDonough: Utah Supreme Court Chief Justice
- Megan McJames: 2010, 2014, and 2018 Olympic slalom skier
- Jim Nantz: sportscaster
- Madison Olsen: 2018 Olympic freestyle skier
- Hal Prewitt: racecar driver and businessman
- Matthew Prince: co-founder and CEO of Cloudflare
- Elli Reed: professional soccer player
- Harry Reems: 1970s porn star
- William Rhoads: 2018 Olympic ski jumper
- Abby Ringquist: 2018 Olympic ski jumper
- Mitt Romney: former Governor of Massachusetts, 2012 GOP Presidential nominee, Senator from Utah
- Summer Sanders: 1992 Olympic gold medalist in swimming; sports commentator, television personality and actress
- Grant Sanderson, author of mathematics YouTube channel 3Blue1Brown with over 7 million subscribers as of 2025.
- John Schnatter: businessman and founder of Papa John's Pizza
- Barry Sims: NFL offensive lineman for San Francisco 49ers, graduated from Park City High School
- Will Smith: star of The Fresh Prince of Bel-Air and Men in Black films.
- John Terry: actor known for playing Christian Shephard on Lost
- Roger J. Traynor: Chief Justice of the California Supreme Court
- Ronnie Vannucci Jr.: drummer from the American rock band The Killers
- Lindsey Vonn: Alpine ski racer and 2010 Olympic gold medalist.
- McRae Williams: Freestyle skier at the 2018 Winter Olympics
- Montel Williams: television actor and former tabloid talk show host.
- Treat Williams: actor known for films and playing Dr. Andrew Brown in Everwood
- Bradley Wilson: Mogul skier at the 2014 and 2018 Winter Olympics
- Bryon Wilson: 2010 Olympic bronze medalist in Mogul skiing
- Scott Wolf: television and film actor known for playing Bailey Salinger on Party of Five

== Sister cities ==
- Courchevel (Savoy), France

== See also ==
- List of cities and towns in Utah
- National Register of Historic Places listings in Summit County, Utah
- Ontario silver mine
