= Snyderville Basin =

Valley in Summit County, Utah

Coordinates: 40°43′34″N 111°30′34″W

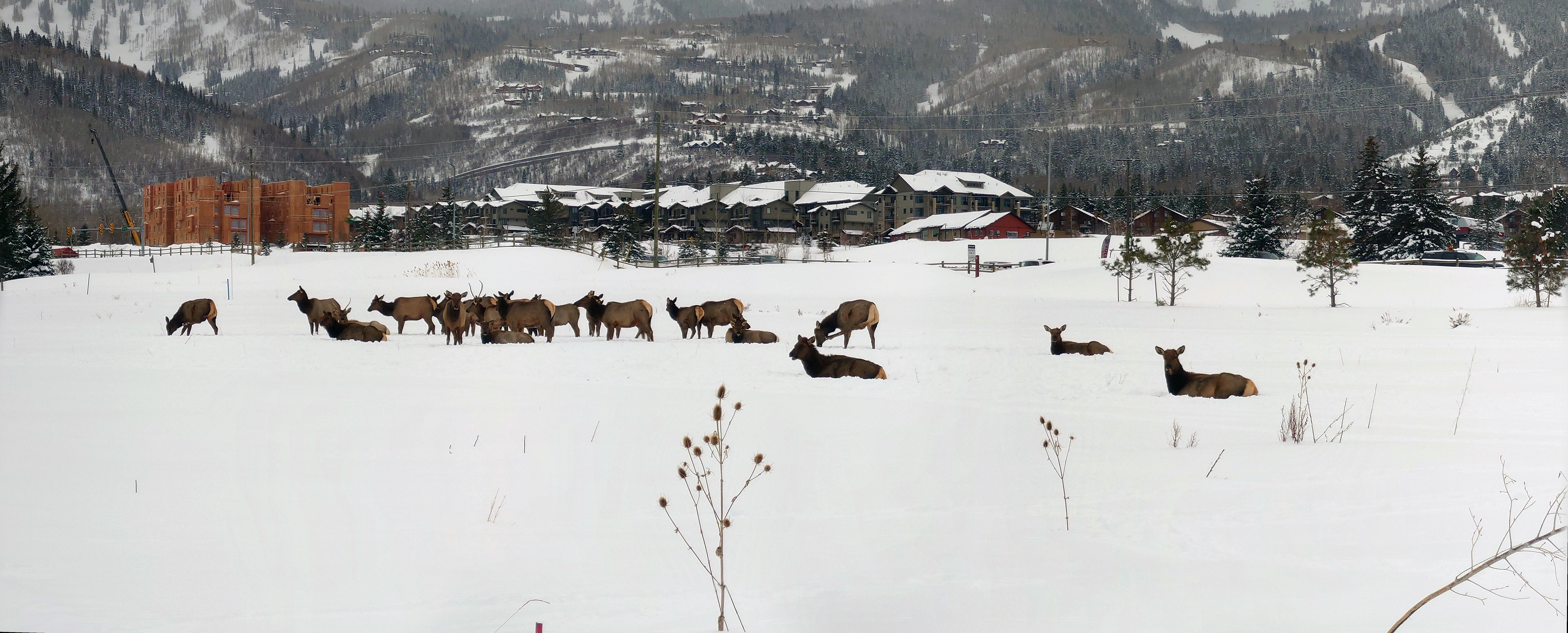
Elk herd by Highway 224 in the South Snyderville Basin December 30, 2021

The Snyderville Basin is a valley in Summit County, Utah adjacent to Park City. Many of the residents of the Park City area live in the Snyderville Basin. Though the area lies outside of the Park City limits, and receives many services from Summit County instead of Park City, it is part of the Park City School District. Major landmarks within the Snyderville basin include Canyons Village at Park City, Utah Olympic Park, Swaner EcoCenter, the Basin Recreation Fieldhouse and the Kimball Junction commercial centers.

The Snyderville Basin is named for the pioneer community of Snyderville, named for Samuel Comstock Snyder, a Mormon pioneer who opened a sawmill in the 1850s. Lumber was one of the area's earliest economic drivers as were stagecoach, mail, and hospitality services along the major east-west travel corridor that passed through Kimball Junction, named for stagecoach impresario William Henry Kimball. In the 1870s, silver was discovered in Park City, and the Snyderville area became economically integrated into the adjacent boom town.

Though many people and businesses are currently located in the area that was once the settlement of Snyderville, there is no actual town center and no independent governance. The area has several residential neighborhoods, a convenience store, an elementary school, a nursery, a small office park, and some farm land. A sign marks the area as Snyderville, and mail addressed to Snyderville will be delivered, though most residents use a Park City mailing address.

The Snyderville Basin is home to many bike and recreational trails, most of which are managed by Basin Recreation.
