= Swaner EcoCenter =

Nature Preserve in Summit County, Utah

- Founded: 1993
- Location: Park City, Utah, United States
- Coordinates: 40.7217°N 111.5377°W
- Website: www.swanerecocenter.org
- Formerly called: Swaner Preserve and EcoCenter

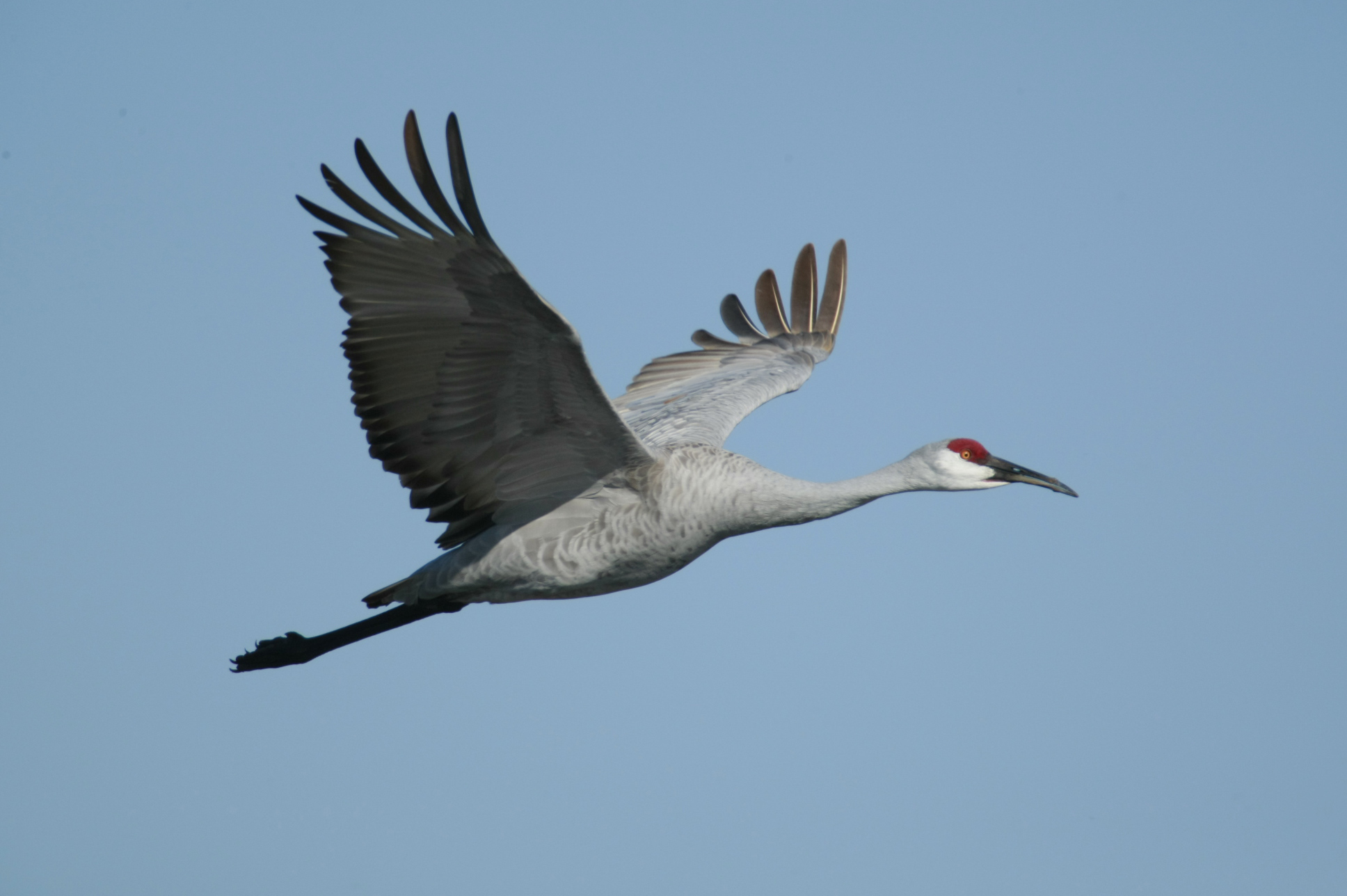
The sandhill crane, one of the more than 90 species of birds found at the Preserve.

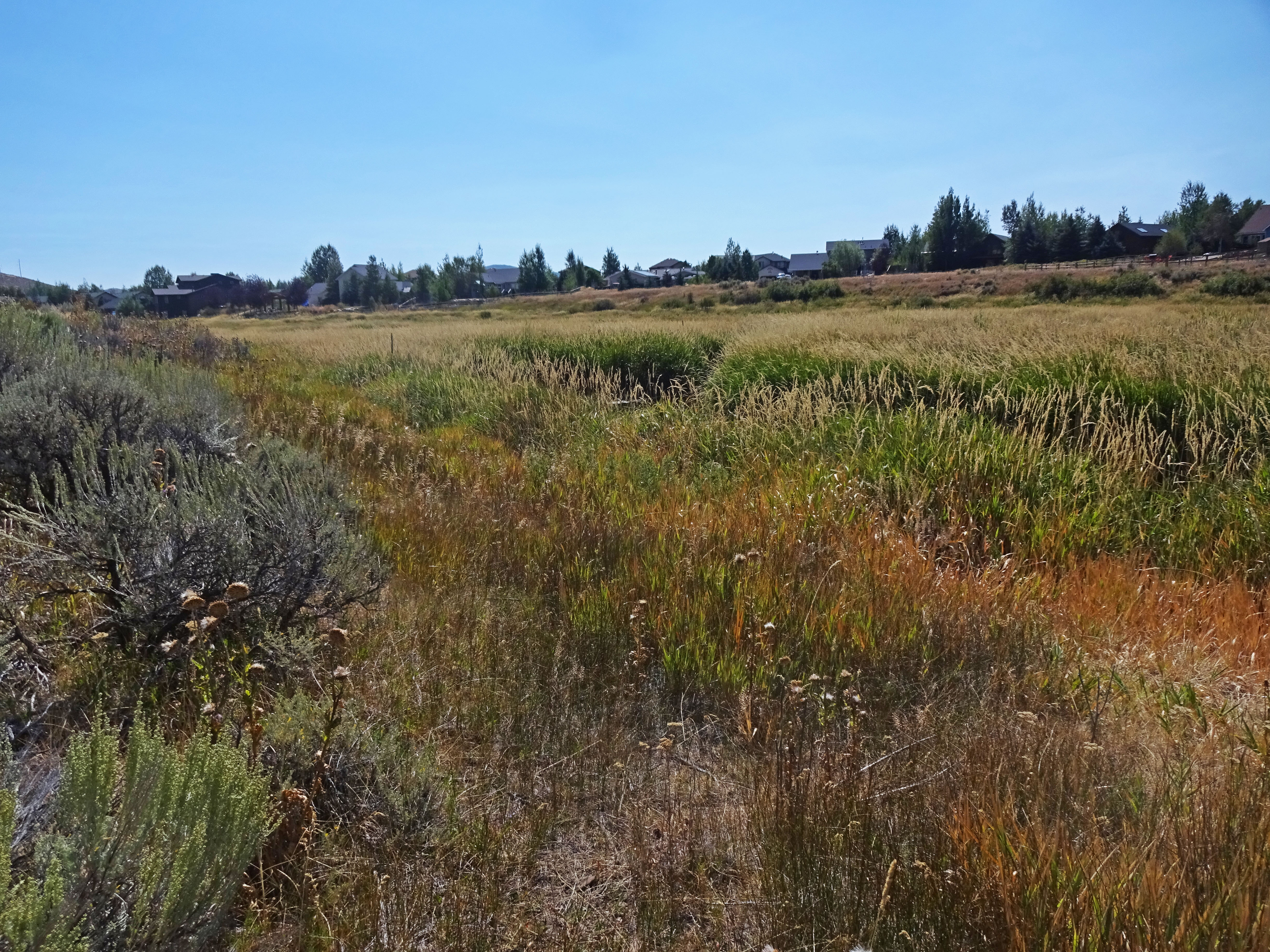
Riparian area in the public part of the Swaner EcoCenter

The Swaner EcoCenter is a nature preserve and Utah State University Distance Education site located in Snyderville Basin near Park City, Utah. Swaner encompasses a 1,200-acre (490 ha) wildlife refuge, a 10,000-square-foot (930 m^{2}) state of the art environmental education facility, a 100-acre (40 ha) farm, and 10 miles (16 km) of trails. The EcoCenter works to preserve the land and the human connection to the natural landscape, to educate the local and broader communities about the value of nature, and to nurture both the ecosystem and the people connected with it. The EcoCenter was designed by architect Soren Simonsen to meet the Leadership in Energy and Environmental Design (LEED) platinum certification, the highest standard set by the U.S. Green Building Council.

== History ==
The preserve began as a donation of 190 acres (77 ha) of land in 1993 by the Spring Creek Angus Ranch Partnership in memory of Leland Swaner. Over the next decade several parcels of land would be added, growing the preserve to more than 1,000 acres (400 ha). In 2003, Swaner purchased what is now known as the Swaner Farm, adding 107 acres (43 ha) to the preserve.

In 1933, the iconic white barn was built by the Fletcher family who purchased the farm in 1906 and operated it for more than 35 years. The Fletchers sold the entire farm to the Wallin family who owned the land until 2003 when it was acquired by Swaner.

In January 2010, Utah State University (USU) President Stan Albrecht and the Swaner Preserve and EcoCenter Board of Directors announced that the refuge and center would be transferred to USU. The gift totaled in excess of $30 million, making it the largest gift in USU history. Just one year later, in January 2011, classes began at the center through USU Distance Education.

== See also ==
- List of nature centers in the United States
