= Kimball Junction =

Settlement in Utah, United States

Coordinates: 40.727°N 111.544°W

- Settlement
- Interactive map of Kimball Junction
- Named for: William Henry Kimball

Area
  - Total: 28.2 km^{2} (10.87 sq mi)
- Elevation: 1,978 m (6,491 ft)

Population
  - Total: 6,744
- Time zone: UTC-7 (Mountain Standard Time)
  - Summer (DST): UTC-6 (Mountain Daylight Time)
- Postal code: 84098
- Area code: 435

Kimball Junction is a settlement located in Snyderville, Utah. As of the 2020 U.S. census, the population was 6,744 people. Named after William Henry Kimball and the site of the former Kimball Stage Stop, the area now serves as a gateway to Park City via State Route 224. Kimball Junction is home to the Redstone and Newpark Districts, with both servicing hotels and restaurants, and the Kimball Junction Transit Center, which provides connections to Park City.

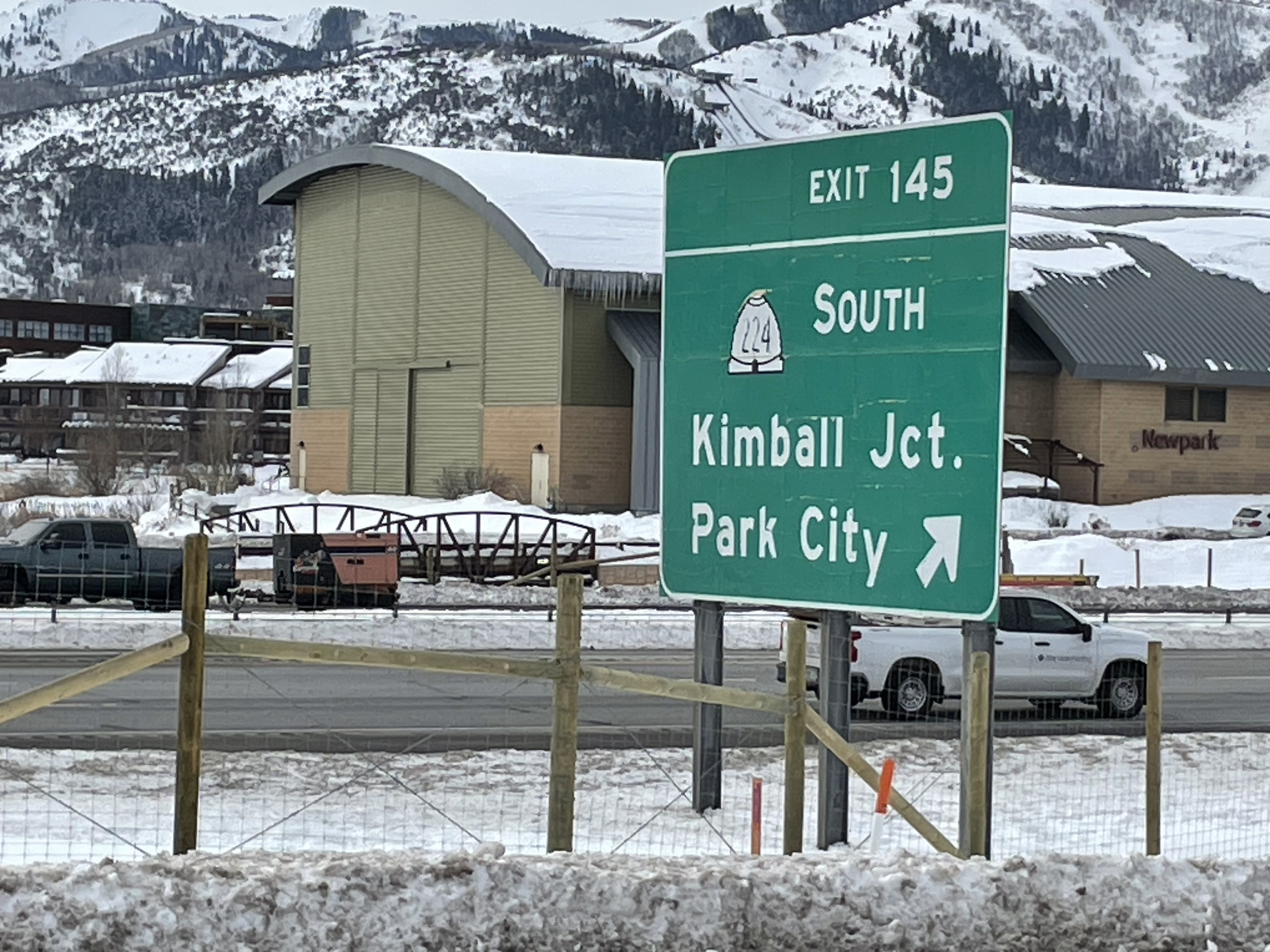
Exit to Kimball Junction from Interstate 80 West

== History ==
Kimball Junction is named after William Henry Kimball, a prominent figure in the Church of Jesus Christ of Latter Day Saints that started the Kimball Stage Stop at the current site of Kimball Junction.

== Geography ==
Kimball Junction is bordered by the Wasatch Mountains to its west, and sits on the intersection of Interstate 80 and State Route 224. Kimball Junction is roughly 15 minutes away from Park City via State Route 224 and serves as a gateway to the ski town. Swaner Preserve is directly adjacent to Kimball Junction.

== Attractions ==
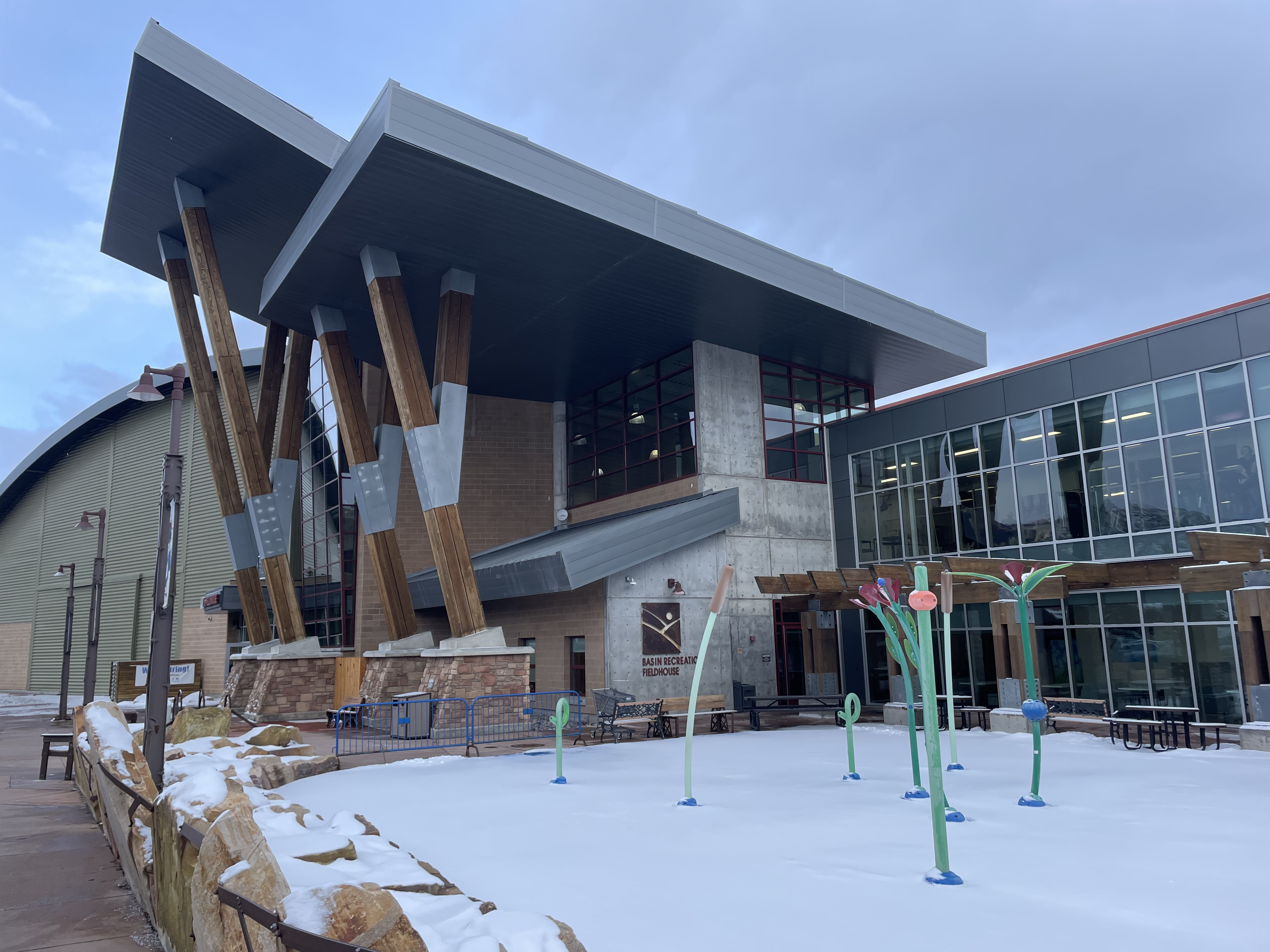
The Basin Recreation Fieldhouse

Kimball Junction is home to the Redstone and Newpark districts, with both servicing shops, restaurants, a movie theater, and an outdoor amphitheater. Basin Recreation manages the Fieldhouse in Kimball Junction, and various recreational trails. The Kimball Junction Transit Center also serves connections to Park City and Salt Lake City. The Swaner Preserve and Ecocenter, a 1,200-acre (490 ha) wildlife refuge, is directly adjacent to Kimball Junction.

=== Neighborhoods ===
Various neighborhoods are located inside Kimball Junction, including Fox Pointe At Redstone, Newpark, Canyon Creek Condos, and Blackhawk Station.
