= Basin Recreation =

Recreation District in Summit County, Utah

Coordinates: 40.7241°N 111.5392°W

Agency overview
- Formed: 1986
- Jurisdiction: Summit County, Utah
- Agency executives: Brandi Connolly, Chair; Carrie Westburg, Vice Chair; Nate Brown, Treasurer; Larry Moffitt, Clerk; Ben Castro, Member; Len McGee, Member; Ryan Bruce, Member
- Parent agency: Summit County, Utah
- Website: https://www.basinrecreation.org/

Basin Recreation is a recreation district in Summit County, Utah. Established in 1986 by the Summit County Board of Commissioners, the district manages roughly 170 miles of trails, over 2300 acres of open space and four parks.

== History ==
Basin Recreation was established in 1986 by the Summit County Board of Commissioners as an agency to provide public recreational services to the Snyderville Basin. In the early 1990s, the Snyderville Basin area was growing rapidly, with Basin Recreation having few resources to deal with the increased demand. This led to the expansion of Basin Recreation's jurisdiction and a new property tax that would increase funding for Basin Recreation. In 1996, Basin Recreation began the development of Trailside Park, the district's first mixed-use public park. The late 1990s saw the opening of Ecker Hill Middle School, along with open fields and an aquatic center, both being funded by Basin Recreation. In the early 2000s, Summit County approved another $11 million bond for Basin Recreations. Later, in 2004, the recreation district opened the FIeldhouse, a building that contained an indoor artificial turf field, indoor running track and weight room. The Fieldhouse was later expanded in 2017 to feature three volleyball courts, two basketball courts, two soccer courts, six Pickleball courts and an outdoor four-lane lap swim pool.

== Operations ==
Seven board of directors administrate Basin Recreation with each serving 4-year terms. Board members are appointed by the city council of Summit. Basin recreation manages 170 miles of trails, 2300 acres of open space and four parks.

=== The Fieldhouse ===
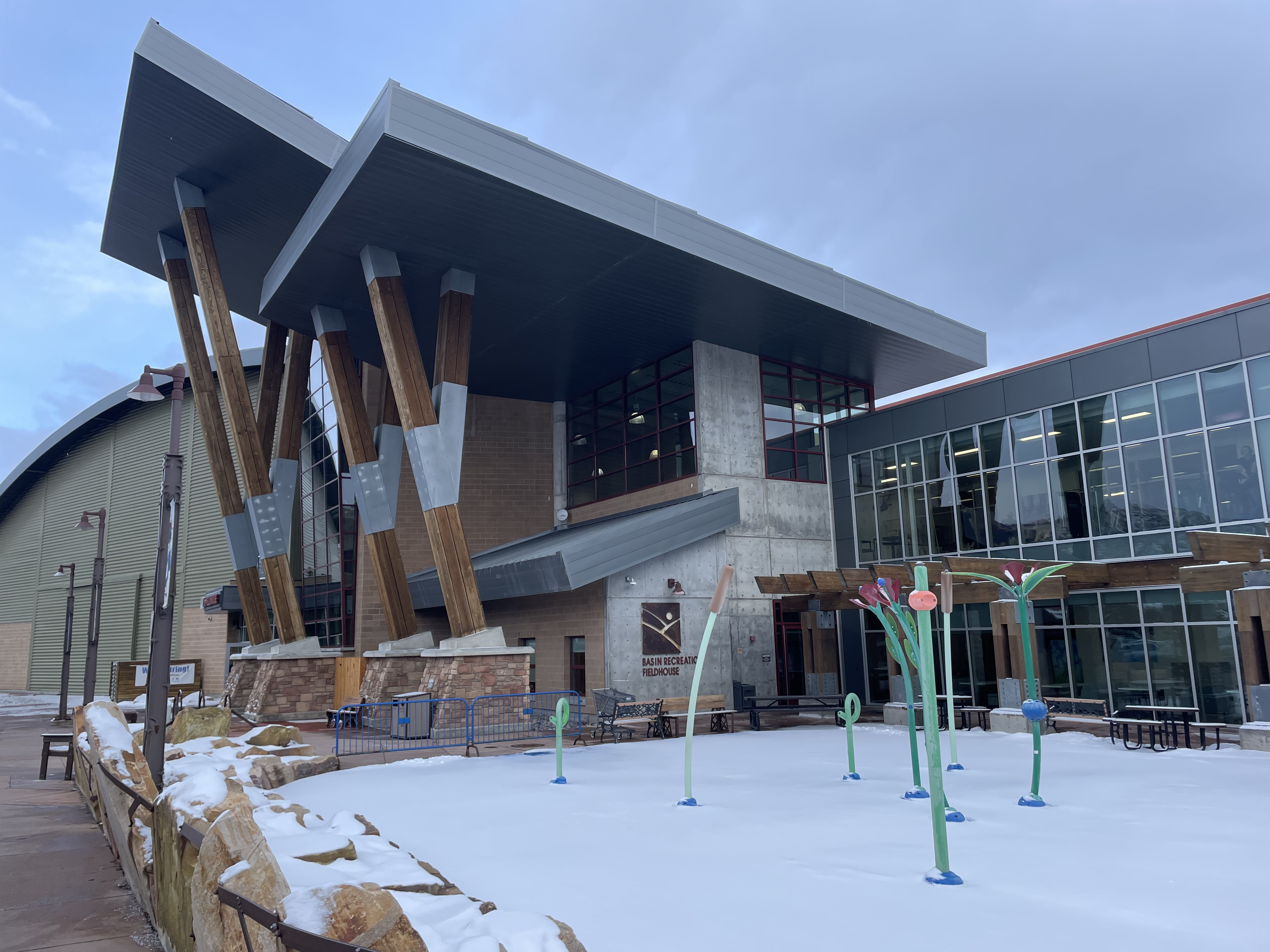
Basin Recreation Fieldhouse

Basin Recreation owns and operates the Fieldhouse, an 87,000 square foot athletic center. The building features an indoor turf field, a multipurpose gymnasium, a weight room, an outdoor splash pad, and more. The Fieldhouse was opened in 2004 and received an expansion in 2017 to include a swimming pool.

=== Trailside Park ===
Trailside Park was Basin Recreation's first mixed-use park and was constructed in 1996. The park has since received additional upgrades, including a new playground. Trailside Park currently features playgrounds, mixed-use fields, a Disc golf course, a bike park, and more.

==== Trailside East ====
Trailside East is directly adjacent to Trailside Park and features restrooms and two mixed-use, artificial-turf fields. The park was completed in 2023 and is 10 acres large.

=== Willow Creek Park ===
Willow Creek Park was built in 2005 and features a 9,000 square foot park, mixed-use fields and a dog park. In 2023, Basin Recreation updated the original Willow Creek playground with a more recent design that featured inclusive elements.

=== Matt Knoop Memorial Park ===
The Matt Knoop Memorial Park is 0.5 miles away from the Willow Creek Park and features an artificial turf field, a playground and a bike pump track.

=== Trails ===
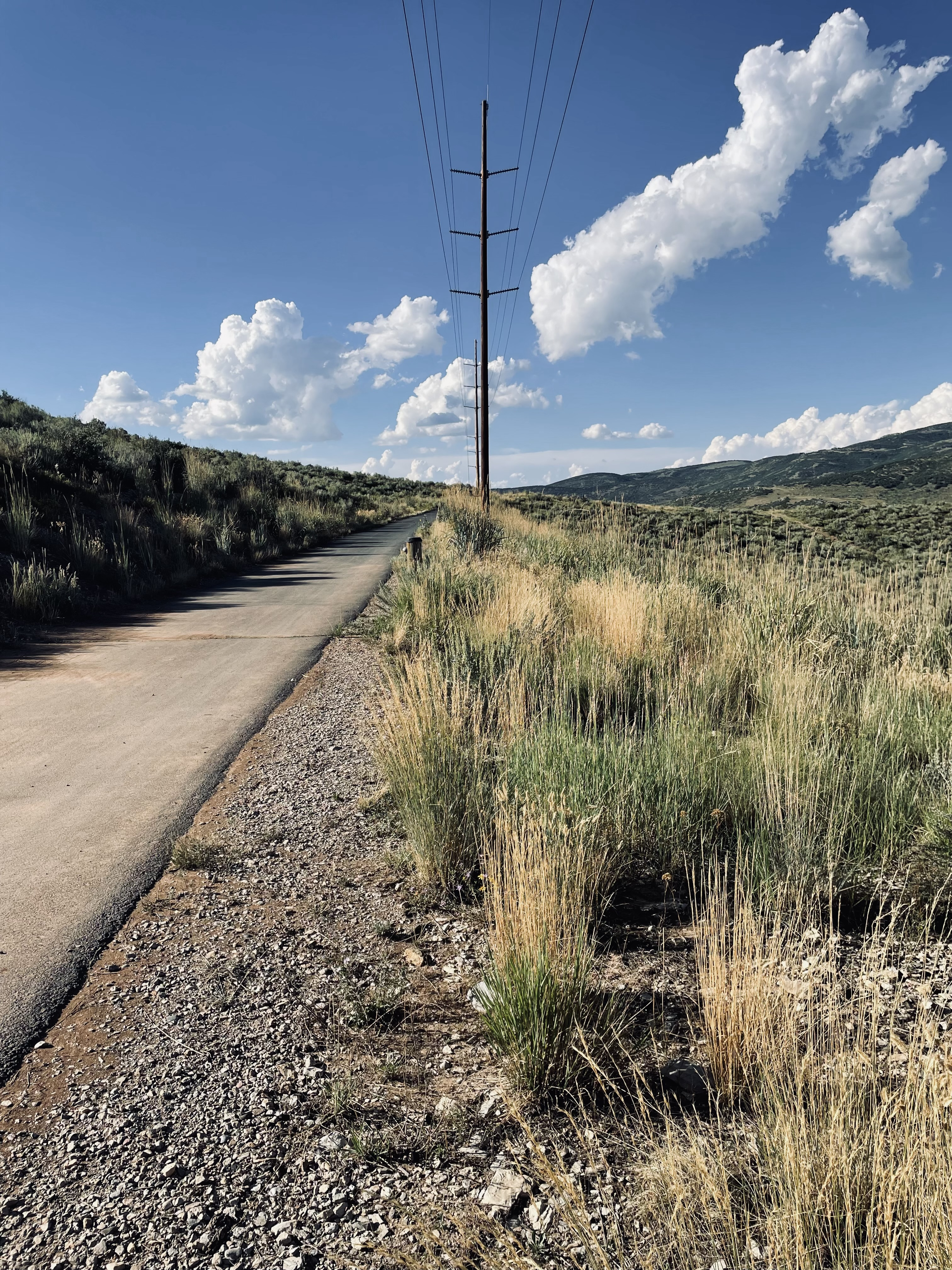
Millennium Trail near trailhead

Basin Recreation operates and maintains 170 miles of trails, including the Trailside Bike Park. The recreation district has received the IMBA Gold Level Ride Center Award in 2012 for its trail and recreation equipment. Among Basin Recreation's trails, 12 miles are soft-surfaces, 29 miles are paved, and 125 miles are naturally-surfaced.
