= Summit Chief Mountain =

Mountain in Washington (state), United States

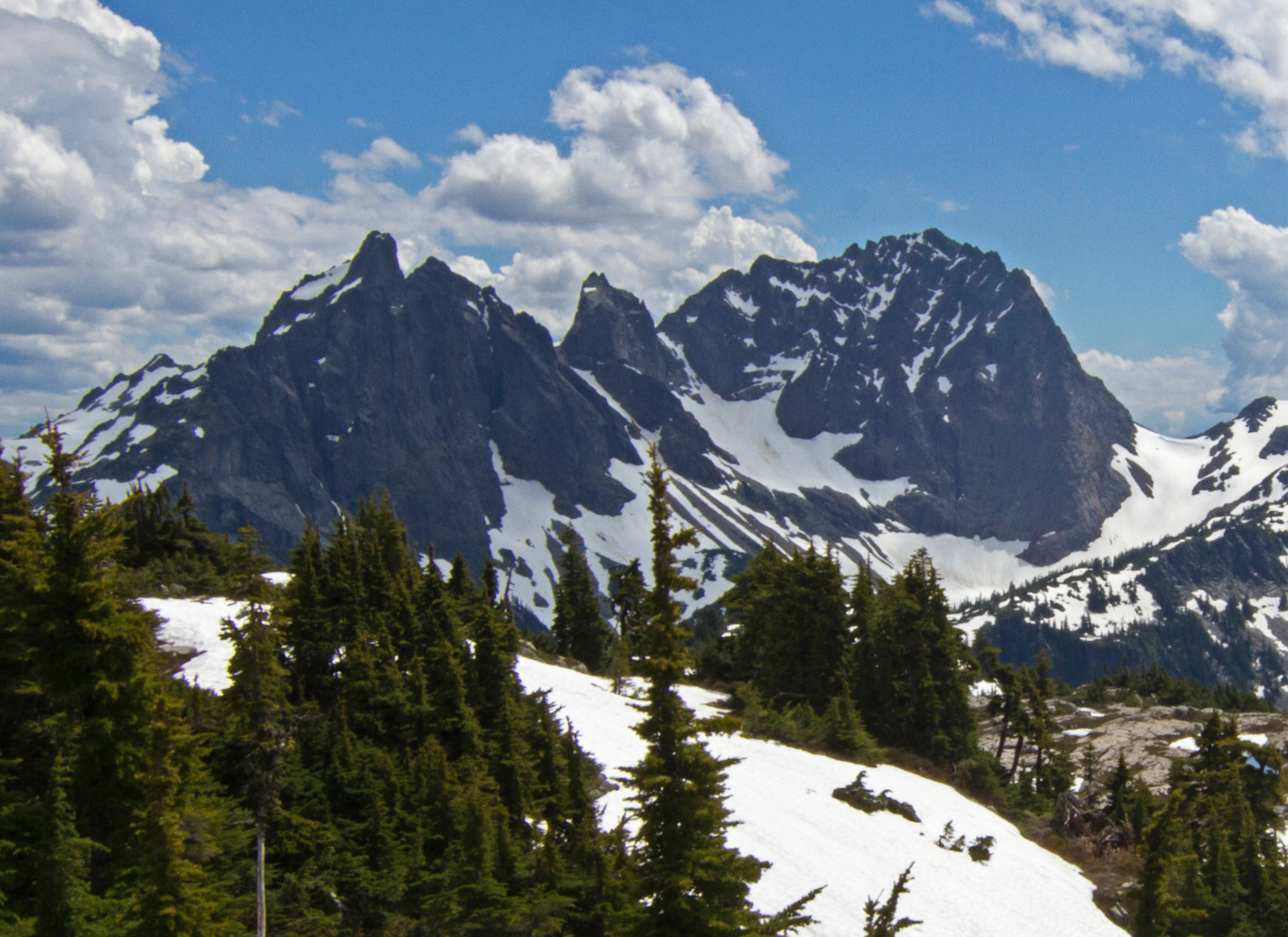
- Summit Chief Mountain, north aspect

Highest point
- Elevation: 7,467 ft (2,276 m)
- Prominence: 1,323 ft (403 m)
- Parent peak: Chimney Rock
- Isolation: 1.29 mi (2.08 km)
- Coordinates: 47°31′24″N 121°16′06″W

Geography
- Location within Washington (state) Location within the United States
- Country: United States
- State: Washington
- County: King / Kittitas
- Protected area: Alpine Lakes Wilderness
- Parent range: Cascade Range
- Topo map: USGS Big Snow Mountain

Climbing
- First ascent: 1925
- Easiest route: Scrambling Southeast Face

Summit Chief Mountain is a 7,467-foot (2,276-meter) mountain summit located on the county line separating King County and Kittitas County in Washington state. It is entirely within the Alpine Lakes Wilderness, on land managed by Mount Baker-Snoqualmie National Forest. Summit Chief Mountain is situated on the crest of the Cascade Range, nine miles northeast of Snoqualmie Pass. Precipitation runoff from the west side of the mountain drains into tributaries of the Snoqualmie River, whereas the east side drains into tributaries of the Yakima River. The nearest higher peak is Chimney Rock, 1.29 miles (2.08 km) to the southwest.

== Climate ==
Summit Chief Mountain is located in the marine west coast climate zone of western North America. Weather fronts originating in the Pacific Ocean move northeast toward the Cascade Mountains. As fronts approach, they are forced upward by the peaks of the Cascade Range, causing them to drop their moisture in the form of rain or snow onto the Cascades (Orographic lift). As a result, the west side of the Cascades experiences high precipitation, especially during the winter months in the form of snowfall. Because of maritime influence, snow tends to be wet and heavy, resulting in avalanche danger. During winter months, weather is usually cloudy, but due to high pressure systems over the Pacific Ocean that intensify during summer months, there is often little or no cloud cover during the summer.

== Geology ==
The Alpine Lakes Wilderness features some of the most rugged topography in the Cascade Range with craggy peaks and ridges, deep glacial valleys, and granite walls spotted with over 700 mountain lakes. Geological events occurring many years ago created the diverse topography and drastic elevation changes over the Cascade Range leading to the various climate differences. These climate differences lead to vegetation variety defining the ecoregions in this area. The elevation range of this area is between about 1,000 feet (300 m) in the lower elevations to over 9,000 feet (2,700 m) on Mount Stuart.

The history of the formation of the Cascade Mountains dates back millions of years ago to the late Eocene Epoch. With the North American Plate overriding the Pacific Plate, episodes of volcanic igneous activity persisted. In addition, small fragments of the oceanic and continental lithosphere called terranes created the North Cascades about 50 million years ago.

During the Pleistocene period dating back over two million years ago, glaciation advancing and retreating repeatedly scoured the landscape leaving deposits of rock debris. The last glacial retreat in the Alpine Lakes area began about 14,000 years ago and was north of the Canada–US border by 10,000 years ago. The U-shaped cross section of the river valleys is a result of that recent glaciation. Uplift and faulting in combination with glaciation have been the dominant processes which have created the tall peaks and deep valleys of the Alpine Lakes Wilderness area.

== Gallery ==
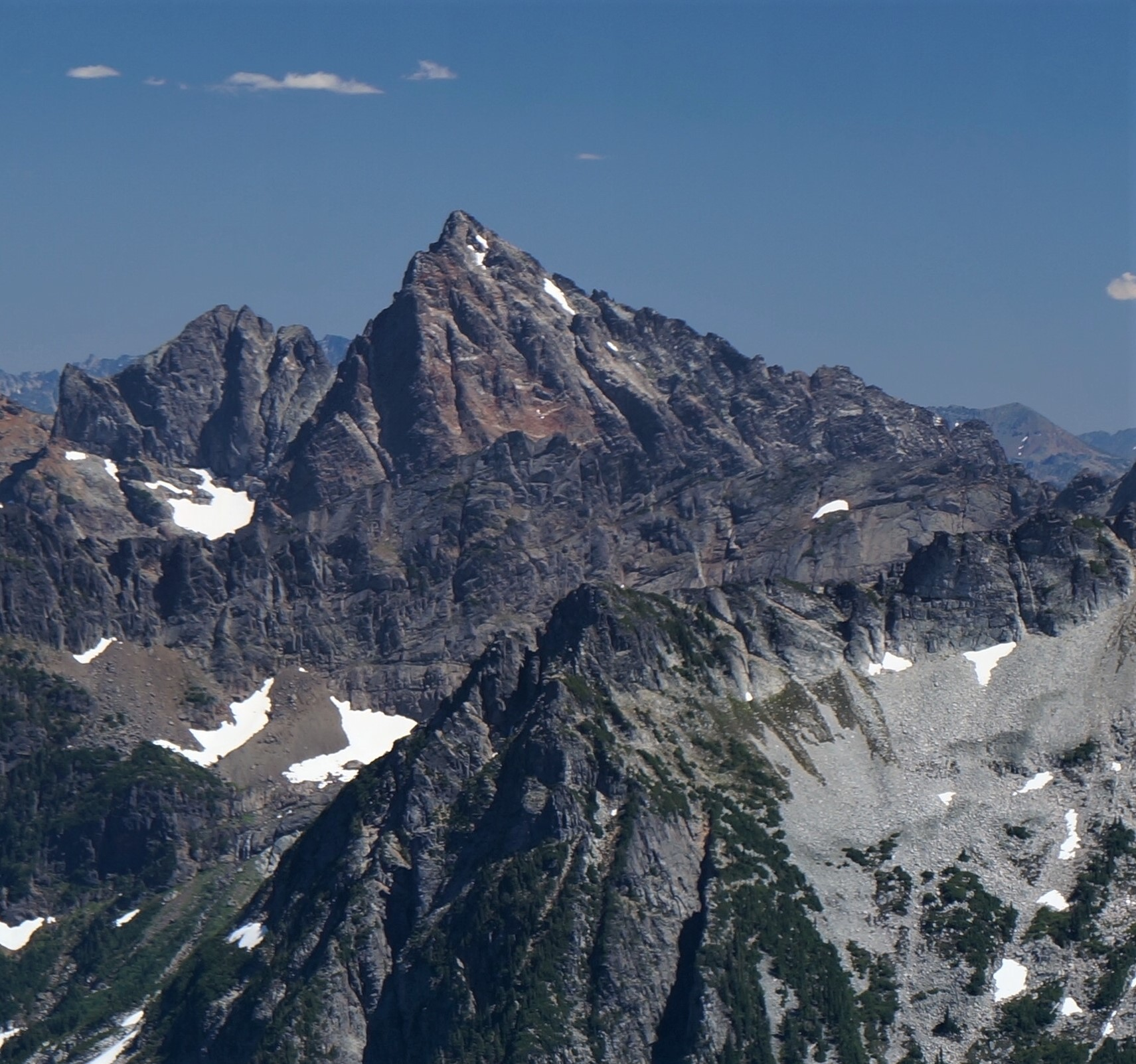
West aspect from Big Snow Mountain

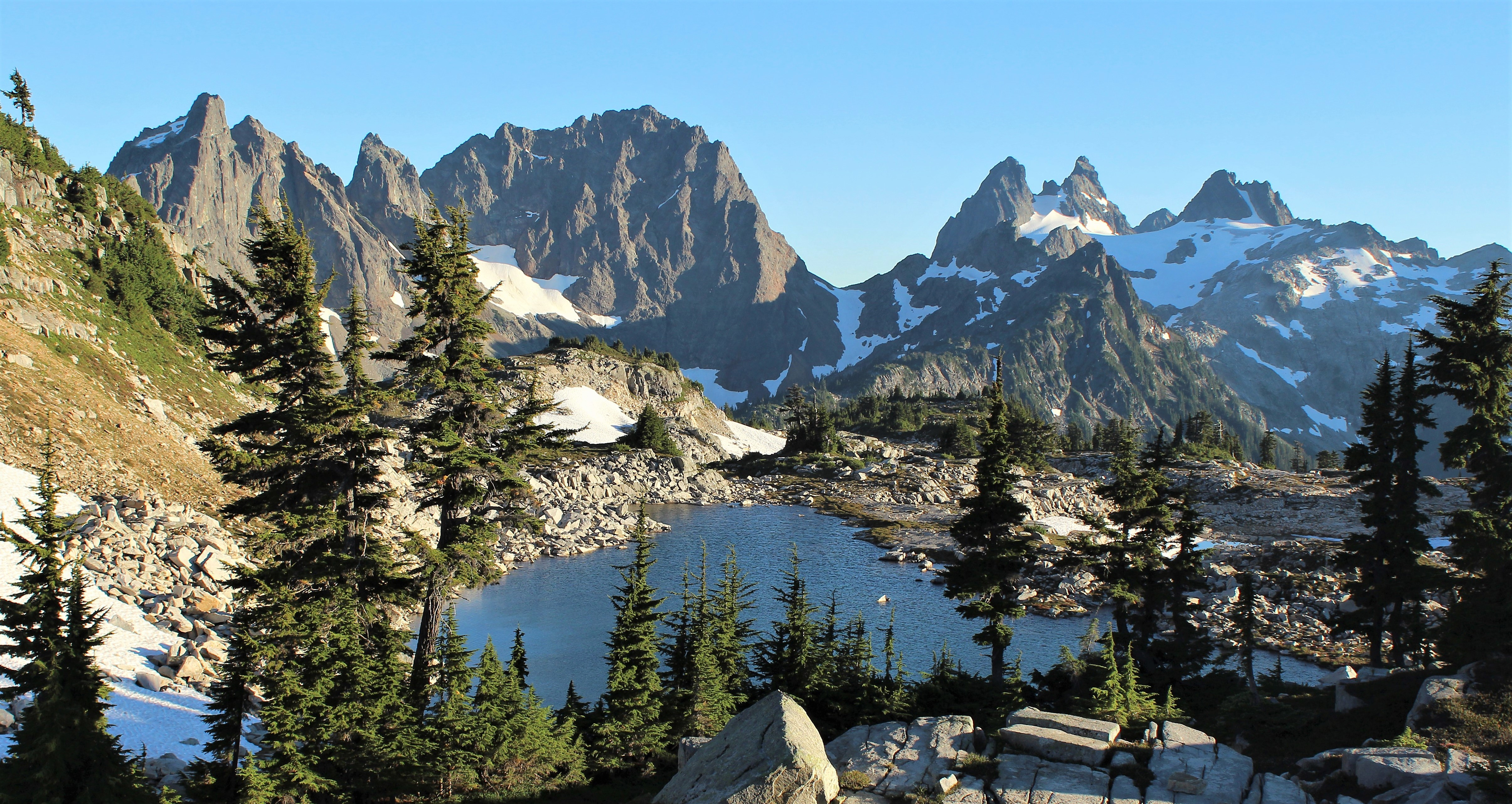
Summit Chief Mountain left of center, from Tank Lakes

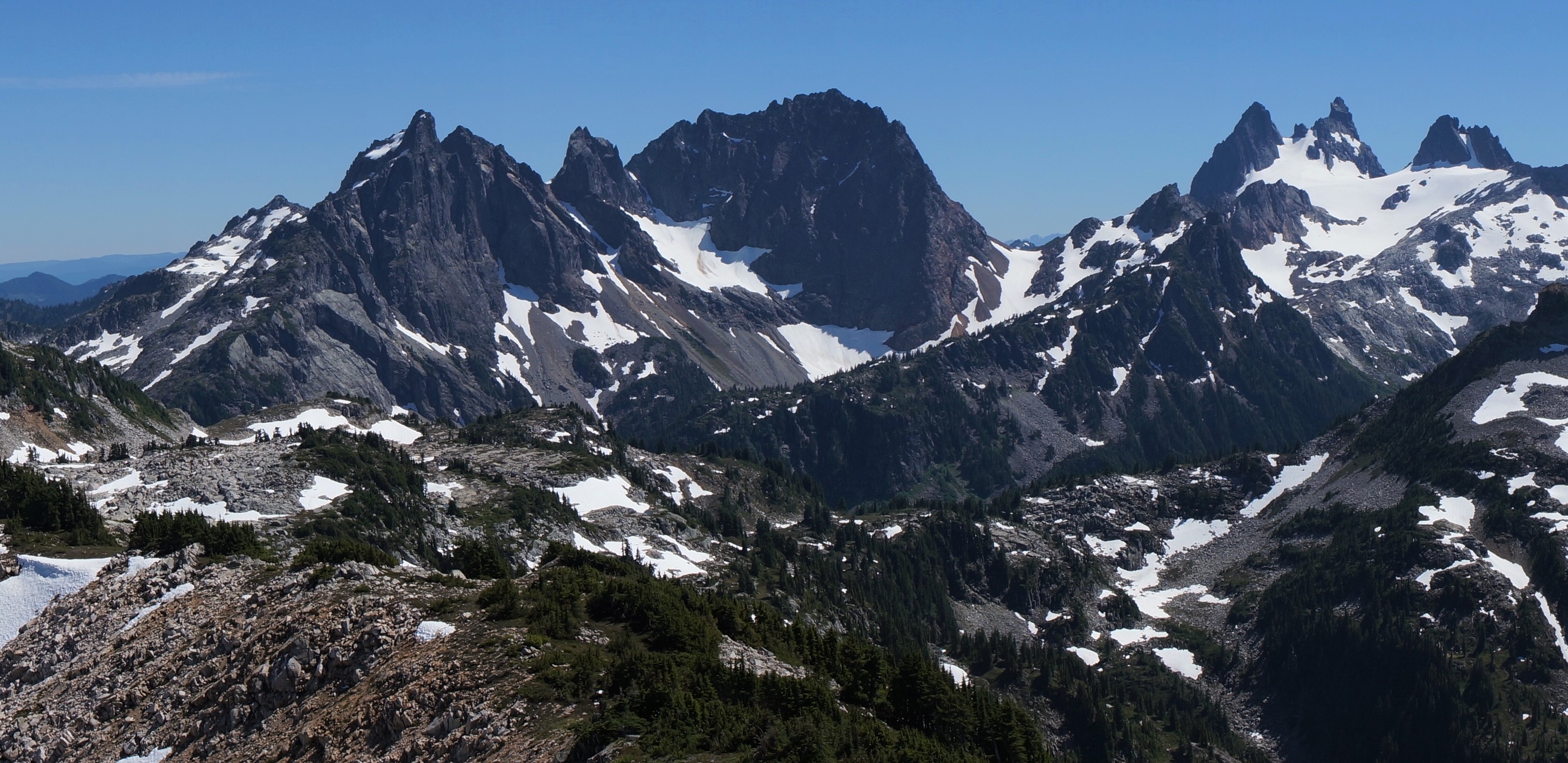
Left to rightː Little Big Chief, Middle Chief, Summit Chief, Chimney Rock, Overcoat

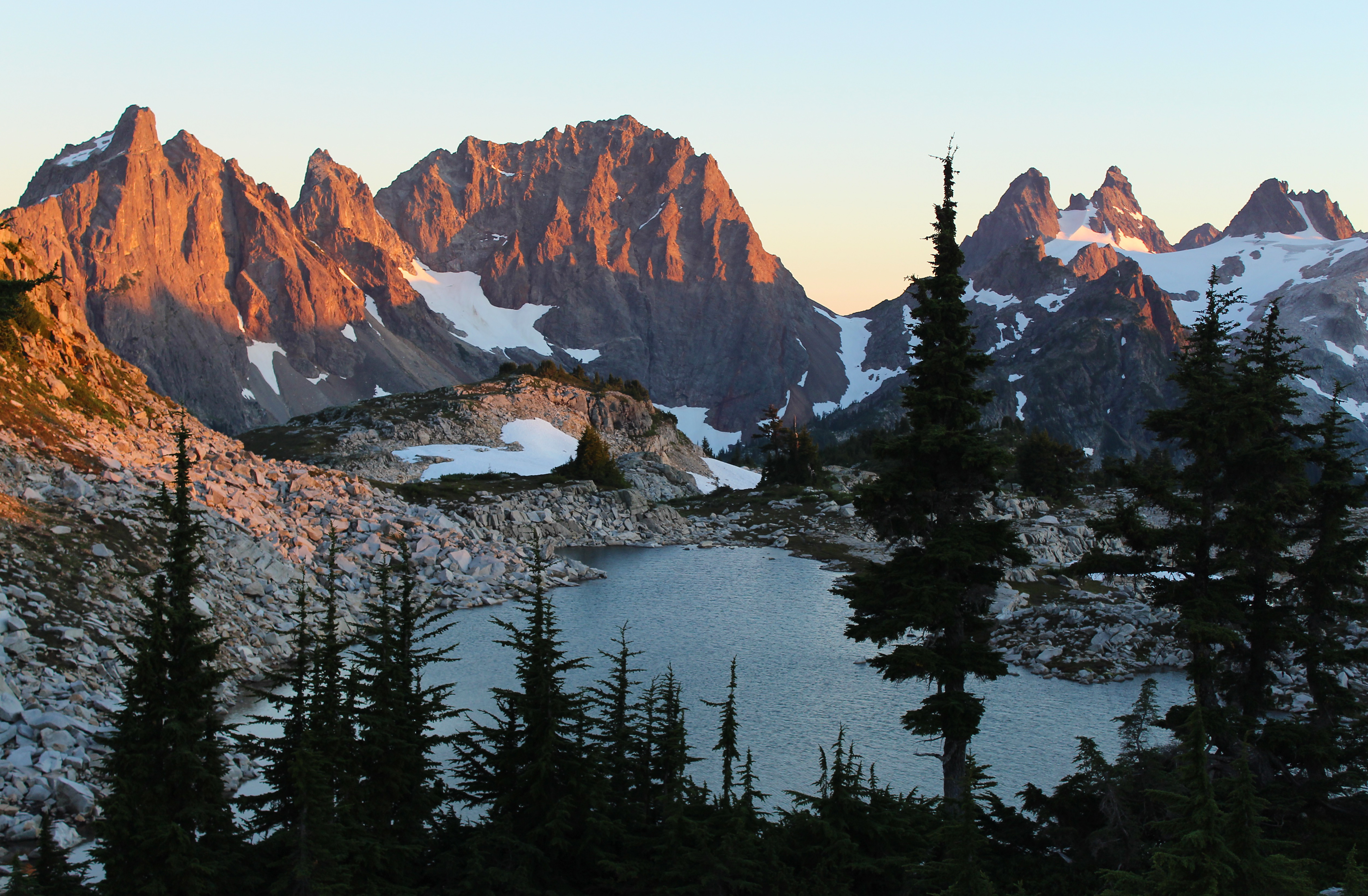

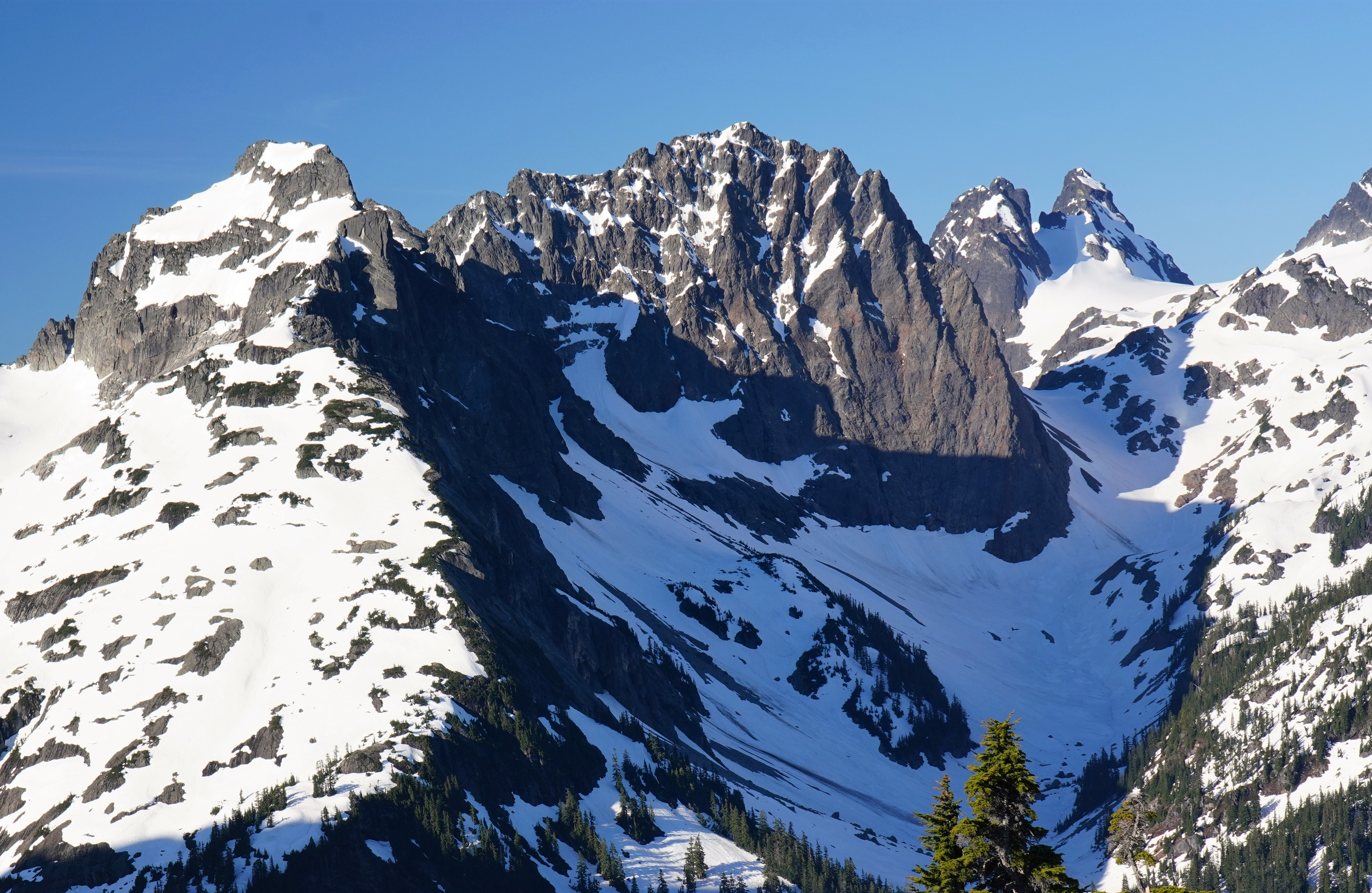
Summit Chief (center)

== See also ==
- List of peaks of the Alpine Lakes Wilderness
- Geology of the Pacific Northwest
