= Overcoat Glacier =

Glacier in Washington, United States

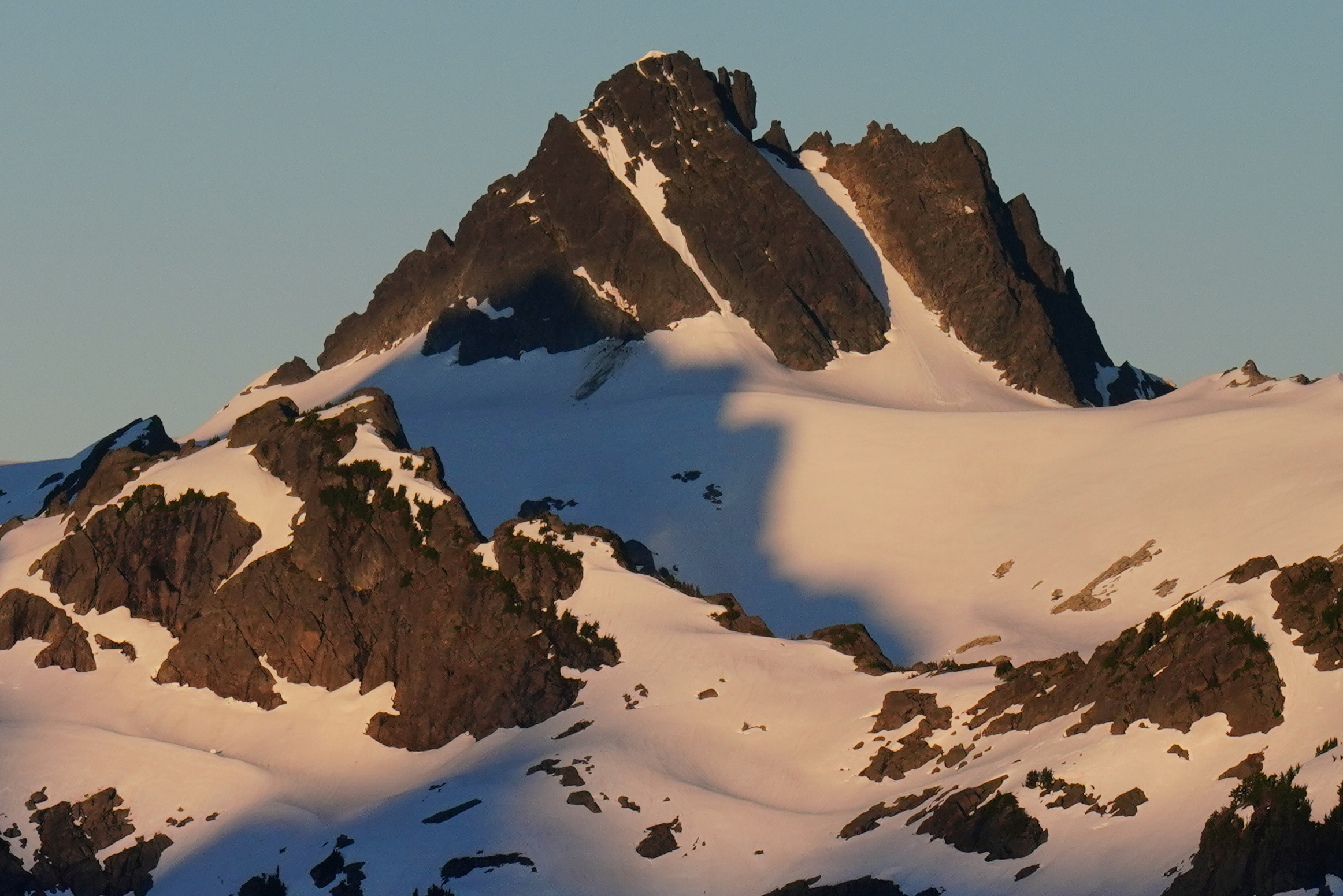
- Overcoat Glacier on Overcoat Peak

- Location within Washington (state)
- Type: Alpine glacier
- Location: King and Kittitas County, Washington, U.S.
- Coordinates: 47°30′50″N 121°17′19″W
- Length: .75 mi (1.21 km)
- Terminus: Barren rock
- Status: Retreating

Overcoat Glacier is in the U.S. state of Washington. Overcoat Glacier is in both Wenatchee and Snoqualmie National Forests and flows north from Overcoat Peak and Chimney Rock. Overcoat Glacier descends from 7,200 to 6,000 ft (2,200 to 1,800 m).

== See also ==
- List of glaciers in the United States
