= Overcoat Peak =

Mountain in Washington (state), United States

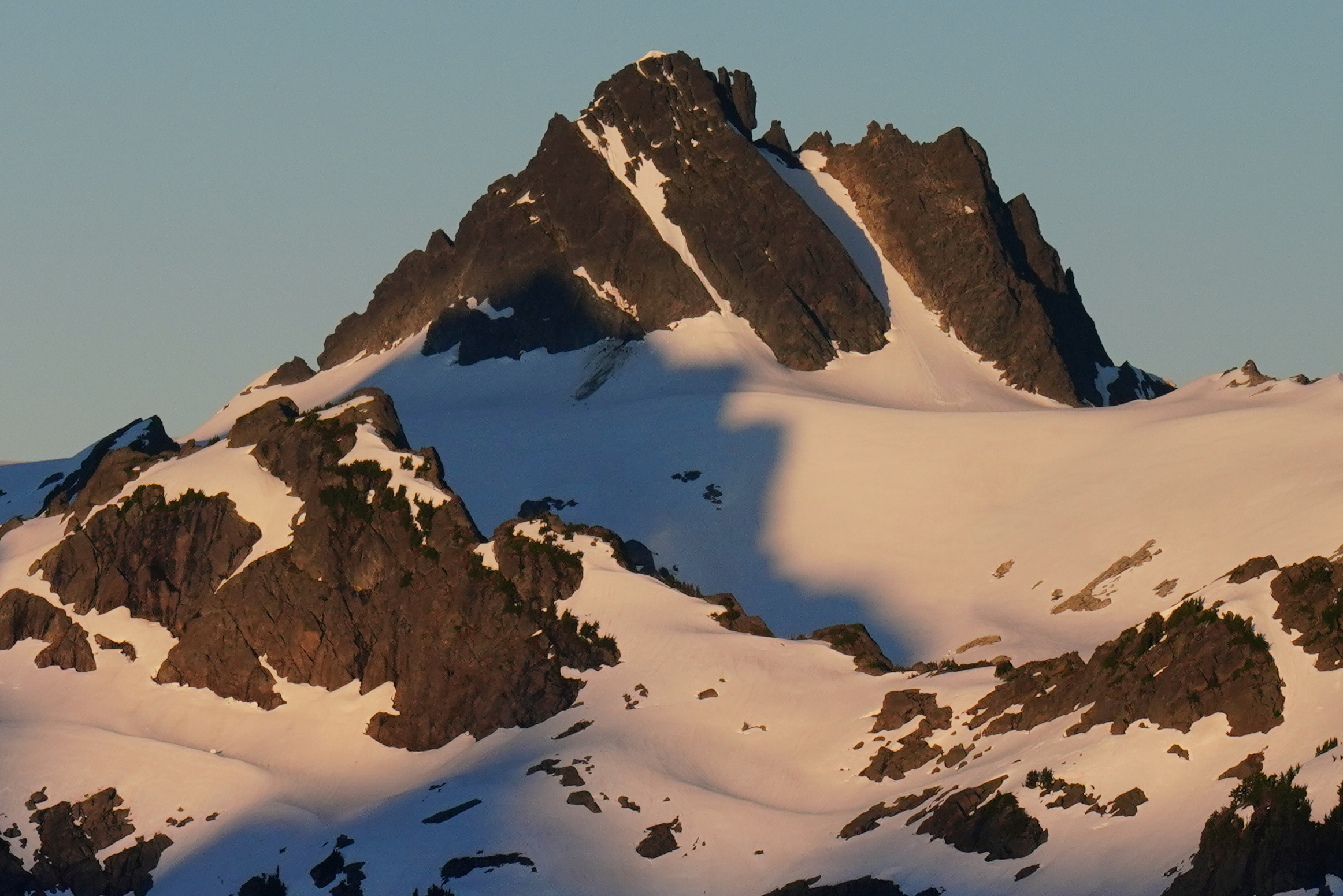
- Northeast aspect

Highest point
- Elevation: 7,432 ft (2,265 m)
- Prominence: 632 ft (193 m)
- Coordinates: 47°30′49″N 121°17′30″W

Geography
- Location within Washington (state) Location within the United States
- Location: King County, Washington, U.S.
- Parent range: Cascade Range
- Topo map: USGS Big Snow Mountain

Climbing
- First ascent: July 1897 by Albert H. Sylvester and John Charlton

Overcoat Peak (7,432 feet (2,265 m)) is in Mount Baker-Snoqualmie National Forest in the U.S. state of Washington. Overcoat Peak is less than .40 mi (0.64 km) northwest of Chimney Rock and both are within the Alpine Lakes Wilderness. Overcoat Glacier is on the east slopes of Overcoat Peak.

Overcoat Peak was named by Albert Hale Sylvester after he left his coat on the mountain on a surveying trip in 1897, which was also the first ascent.

== Climate ==
Overcoat Peak is located in the marine west coast climate zone of western North America. Most weather fronts originate in the Pacific Ocean, and travel northeast toward the Cascade Mountains. As fronts approach the North Cascades, they are forced upward by the peaks of the Cascade Range, causing them to drop their moisture in the form of rain or snowfall onto the Cascades (Orographic lift). As a result, the west side of the North Cascades experiences high precipitation, especially during the winter months in the form of snowfall. During winter months, weather is usually cloudy, but, due to high pressure systems over the Pacific Ocean that intensify during summer months, there is often little or no cloud cover during the summer. Because of maritime influence, snow tends to be wet and heavy, resulting in high avalanche danger.

== Geology ==
The Alpine Lakes Wilderness features some of the most rugged topography in the Cascade Range with craggy peaks and ridges, deep glacial valleys, and granite walls spotted with over 700 mountain lakes. Geological events occurring many years ago created the diverse topography and drastic elevation changes over the Cascade Range leading to the various climate differences.

The history of the formation of the Cascade Mountains dates back millions of years ago to the late Eocene Epoch. With the North American Plate overriding the Pacific Plate, episodes of volcanic igneous activity persisted. In addition, small fragments of the oceanic and continental lithosphere called terranes created the North Cascades about 50 million years ago.

During the Pleistocene period dating back over two million years ago, glaciation advancing and retreating repeatedly scoured the landscape leaving deposits of rock debris. The last glacial retreat in the Alpine Lakes area began about 14,000 years ago and was north of the Canada–US border by 10,000 years ago. The U-shaped cross section of the river valleys is a result of that recent glaciation. Uplift and faulting in combination with glaciation have been the dominant processes which have created the tall peaks and deep valleys of the Alpine Lakes Wilderness area.

== Gallery ==
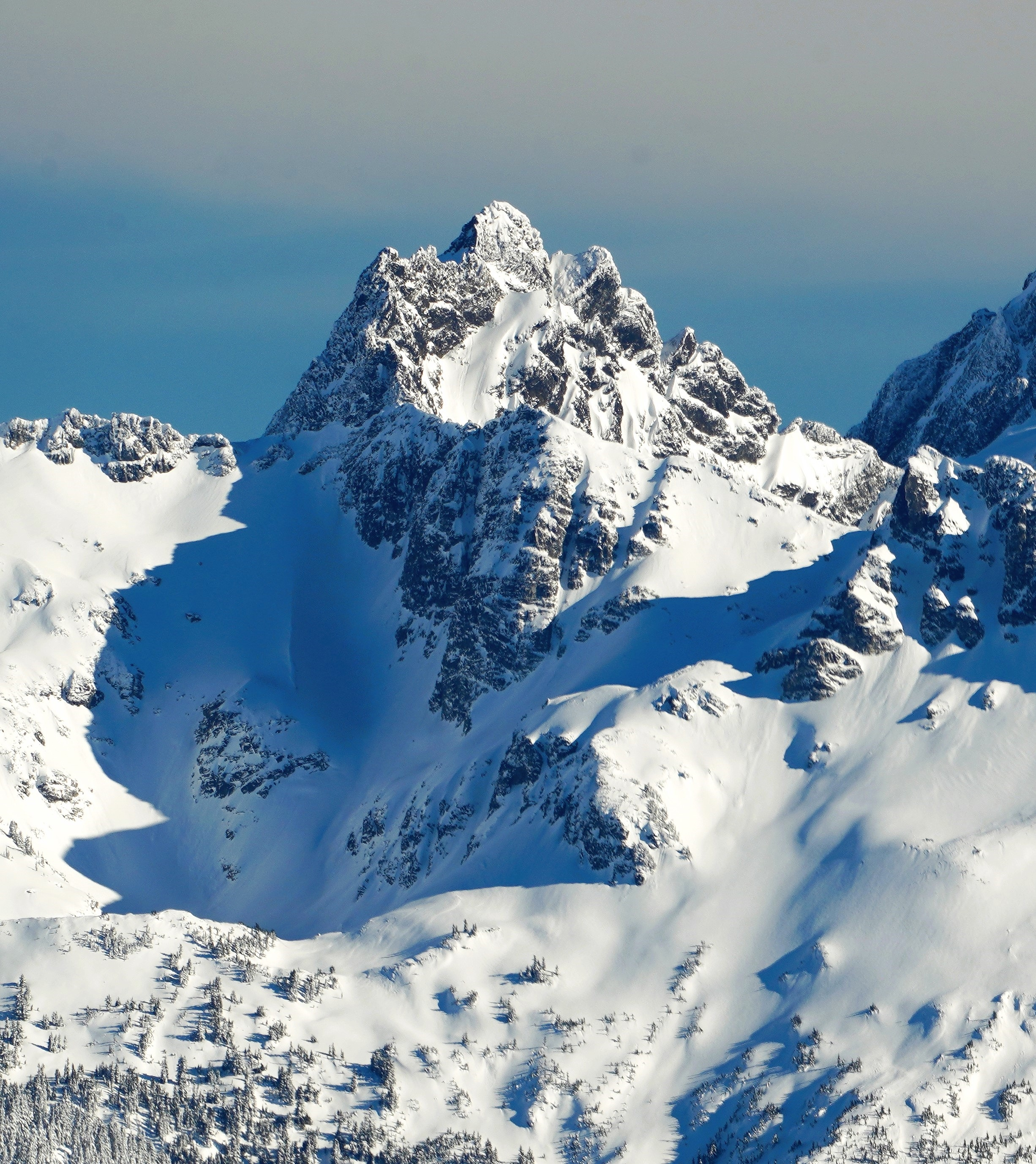
West aspect viewed from South Bessemer Mountain in winter

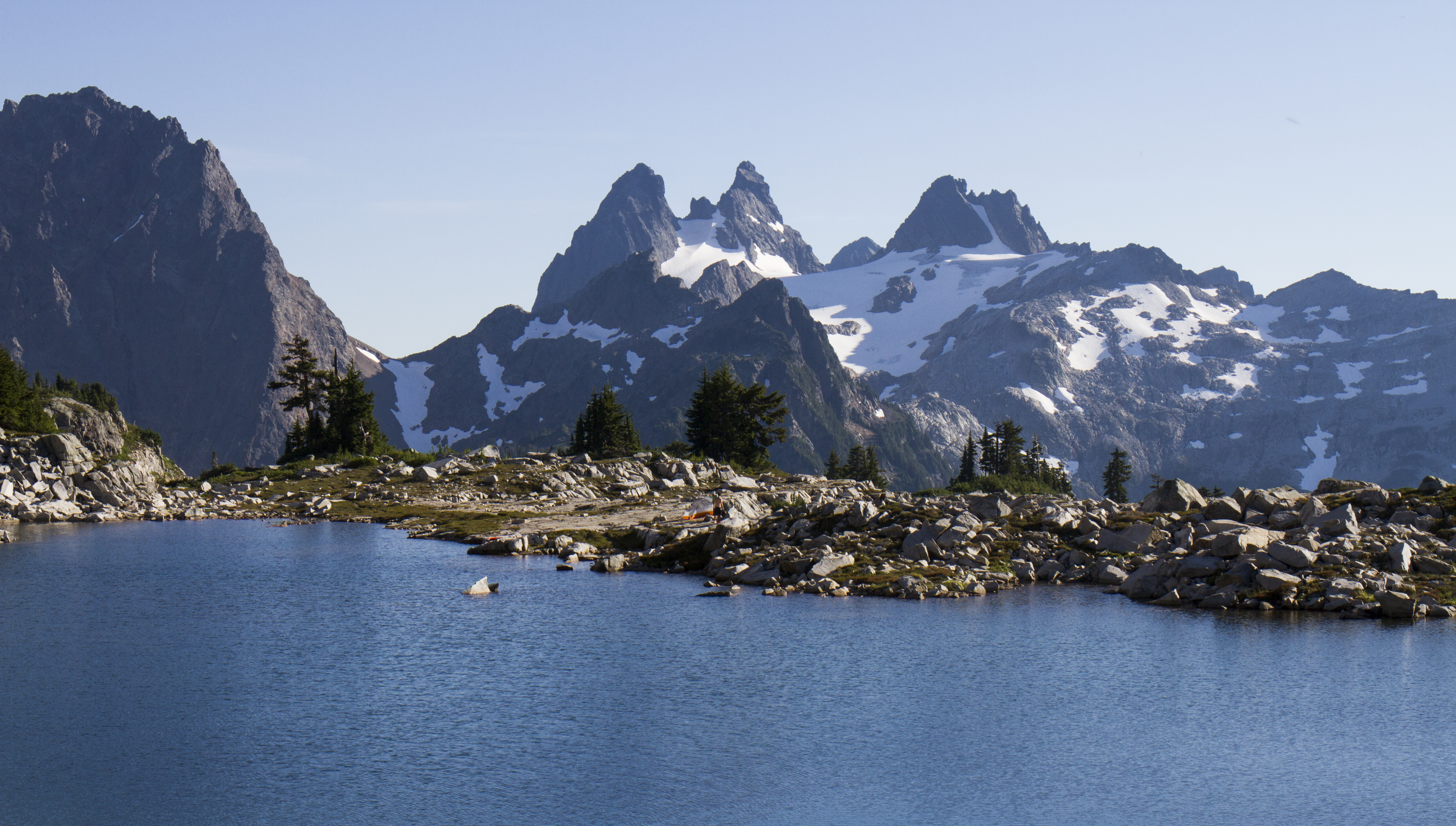
The double summit Chimney Rock centered with Overcoat Peak to right. Lower Tank Lake in foreground.

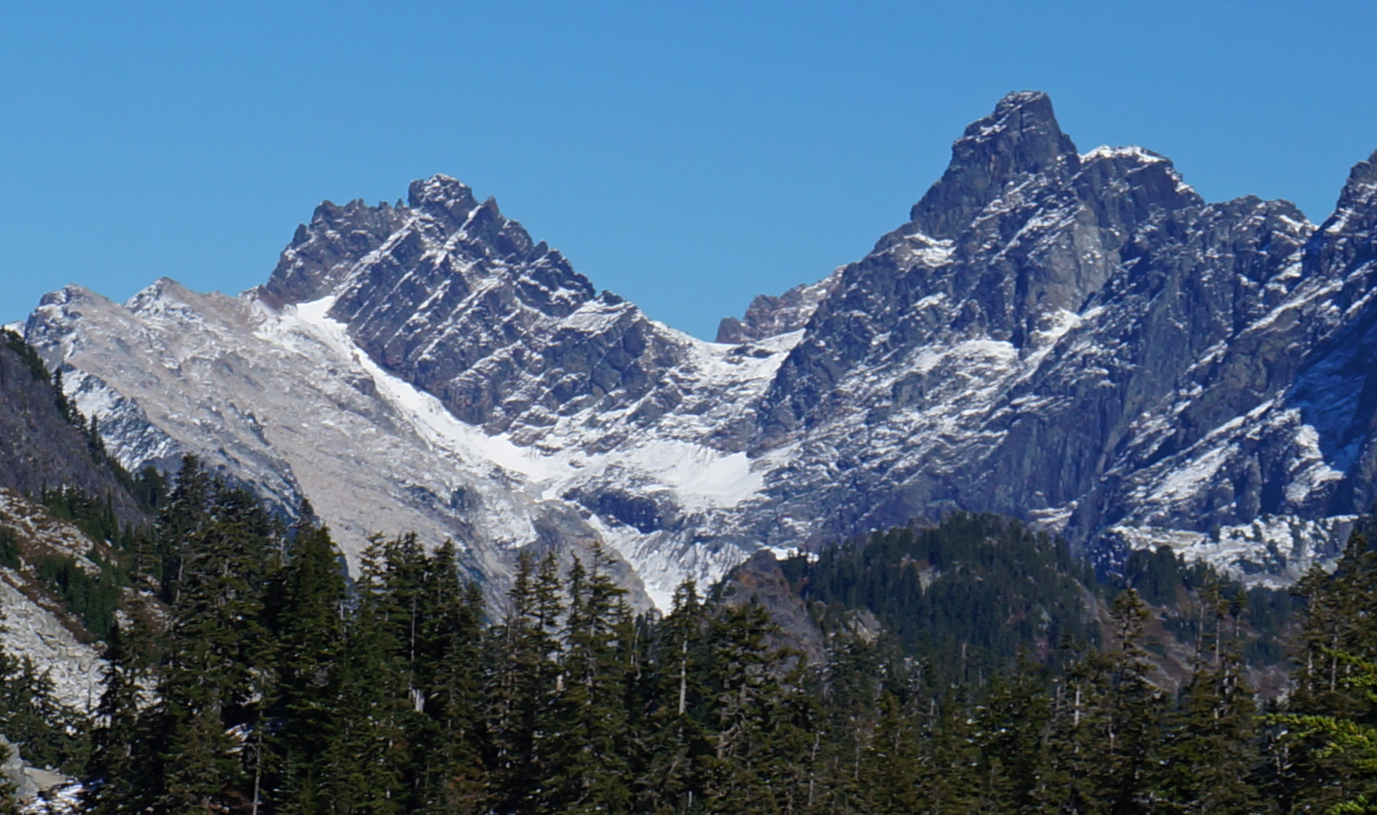
Overcoat Peak (left) and Chimney Rock
