= Chimney Rock (Washington) =

Mountain in Washington (state), United States

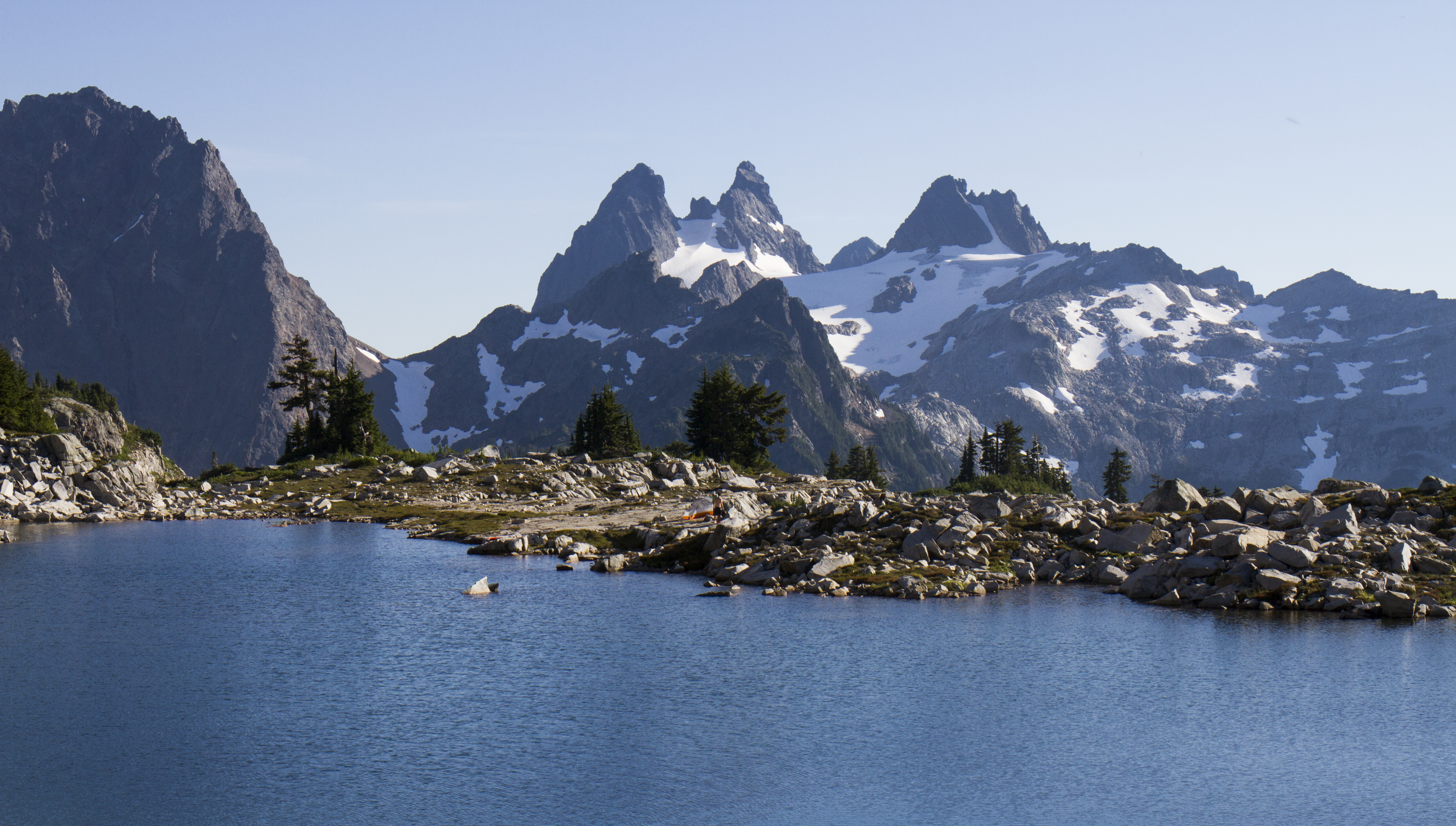
- The double summit Chimney Rock centered. Summit Chief Mountain to left. Overcoat Peak to right. Lower Tank Lake in foreground.

Highest point
- Elevation: 7,727 ft (2,355 m)
- Prominence: 2,727 ft (831 m)
- Coordinates: 47°30′33″N 121°17′08″W

Geography
- Location within Washington (state) Location within the United States
- Location: King and Kittitas County, Washington U.S.
- Parent range: Cascade Range
- Topo map: USGS Big Snow Mountain

Climbing
- First ascent: 27 August 1930 by Forest Farr, Art Winder and Laurence Byington

Chimney Rock is a mountain located in the Alpine Lakes Wilderness of the Central Cascade Range in western Washington, United States. The mountain has two main summits, a northeast spire ("north peak") (7,634 feet (2,327 m)) and a central spire (7,727 feet (2,355 m)), as well as a minor south peak (7,440 feet (2,270 m)). Situated 10 miles NNE of Snoqualmie Pass, with its craggy appearance Chimney Rock is the most distinctive peak on the crest dividing the Snoqualmie River and Yakima River drainage areas. Lemah Mountain (7,480 feet (2,280 m)) is to the south on the crest, and Summit Chief Mountain (7,464 feet (2,275 m)) to the northeast. Overcoat Peak (7,432 feet (2,265 m)) is off the main ridge just to the north of Chimney Rock. The mountain has three glaciers: the Overcoat Glacier on the north, the Chimney Glacier on the south and east, and an unnamed glacier on the east side of the North Peak.

The Main Peak was a prized climbing object in the first half of the 20th century. A report of a party reaching the summit in 1923 turned out to be false, as it had climbed Lemah instead. A group of climbers who made an attempt in 1925 declared the summit as probably impossible. However already on August 27, 1930, Forest Farr, Art Winder and Laurence Byington reached the summit via the south and east face, spending several days for exploration, in a feat quite remarkable for the time. It took 10 years before the summit was reached again, in 1940 by Jim Crooks and Fred Beckey.

Due to the climate and elevation, Chimney Rock is more easily attempted during the early to mid summer. Areas of the climb are rated as YDS Class 5 and require specialized equipment and technical rock climbing to complete.

== Climate ==
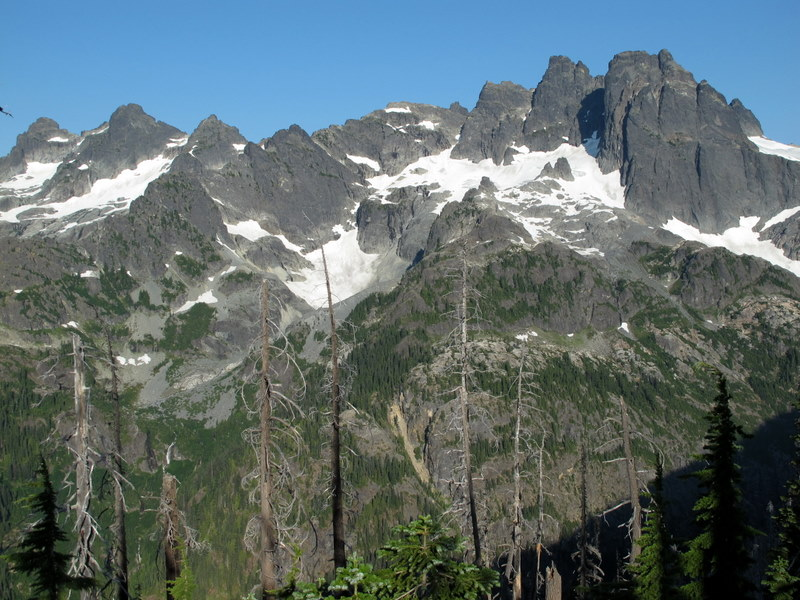
Chimney Rock (east aspect) to right, seen from PCT. (Lemah to left)

Chimney Rock is located in the marine west coast climate zone of western North America. Most weather fronts originate in the Pacific Ocean, and travel northeast toward the Cascade Mountains. As fronts approach, they are forced upward by the peaks of the Cascade Range, causing them to drop their moisture in the form of rain or snowfall onto the Cascades (Orographic lift). As a result, the west side of the Cascades experiences high precipitation, especially during the winter months in the form of snowfall. During winter months, weather is usually cloudy, but, due to high pressure systems over the Pacific Ocean that intensify during summer months, there is often little or no cloud cover during the summer. Because of maritime influence, snow tends to be wet and heavy, resulting in avalanche danger.

== Geology ==
The Alpine Lakes Wilderness features some of the most rugged topography in the Cascade Range with craggy peaks and ridges, deep glacial valleys, and granite walls spotted with over 700 mountain lakes. Geological events occurring many years ago created the diverse topography and drastic elevation changes over the Cascade Range leading to the various climate differences. These climate differences lead to vegetation variety defining the ecoregions in this area. The elevation range of this area is between about 1,000 feet (300 m) in the lower elevations to over 9,000 feet (2,700 m) on Mount Stuart.

The history of the formation of the Cascade Mountains dates back millions of years ago to the late Eocene Epoch. With the North American Plate overriding the Pacific Plate, episodes of volcanic igneous activity persisted. In addition, small fragments of the oceanic and continental lithosphere called terranes created the North Cascades about 50 million years ago.

During the Pleistocene period dating back over two million years ago, glaciation advancing and retreating repeatedly scoured the landscape leaving deposits of rock debris. The last glacial retreat in the Alpine Lakes area began about 14,000 years ago and was north of the Canada–US border by 10,000 years ago. The U-shaped cross section of the river valleys is a result of that recent glaciation. Uplift and faulting in combination with glaciation have been the dominant processes which have created the tall peaks and deep valleys of the Alpine Lakes Wilderness area.

== See also ==
- List of peaks of the Alpine Lakes Wilderness
- Geology of the Pacific Northwest
