= Waptus Lake =

Lake in Kittitas County, Washington

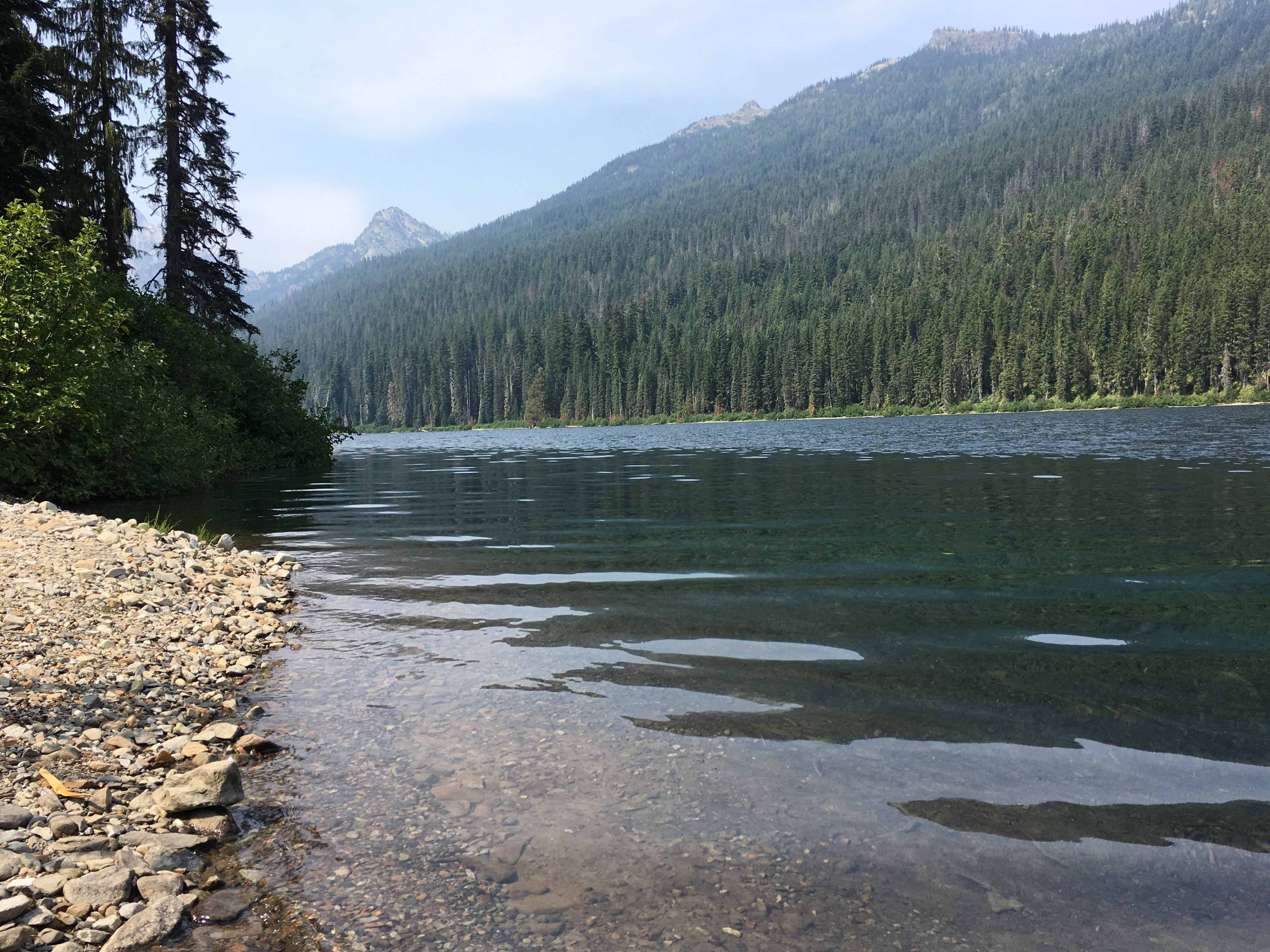
- Shoreline of Waptus Lake

- Location within Washington (state) Location within the United States
- Location: Kittitas County, Washington
- Coordinates: 47.5033969°N 121.1779520°W
- Primary inflows: Waptus River
- Primary outflows: Waptus River
- Basin countries: United States
- Max. length: 1 mile (1.6 km)
- Max. width: 0.2 miles (0.32 km)
- Surface area: 255.2 acres (1.033 km^{2})
- Surface elevation: 2,792 ft (851 m)

Waptus Lake is an alpine freshwater lake located on the southern stretch of the Okanogan–Wenatchee National Forest in Kittitas County, Washington. Because of its proximity to Cooper Lake and the Pacific Crest Trail, Waptus Lake is a popular area for hiking, camping and fishing. Waptus Lake is surrounded by trails that lead to other Alpine lakes in the vicinity, including the Pete Lake and Spectacle Lake at the base of Chikamin Peak.

== Ecology ==
Waptus Lake is one of the largest lakes in the Alpine Lakes Wilderness, located in a prominent valley along the southwestern skirt of the Mount Daniel area in connection with the Chikamin-Keechelus mountain grouping area. The lake stretches from northwest to southeast, approximately 1 mile in length and 0.2 miles wide. Waptus River is one of the tributaries of the Cle Elum River. While mining in the area surrounding Cooper Lake and damming of the Cle Elum River impacted the quality of the salmon habitat, salmon spawning has been prominent on Cle Elum River since the late 2000s.

The Waptus Lake and River watershed supports dolly varden trout, bull and rainbow trout, westslope cutthroat trout, and eastern brook trout.

== History ==
Discovery of a Clovis point projectile along the bottom of Cle Elum Reservoir in 1984, south of Waptus Lake, leads to suggestions that the region may have been a site of the residence of Indigenous peoples of the Northwest Plateau with Clovis culture, perhaps of the Wenatchi People, one of the Confederated Tribes of the Colville Reservation and within the ceded lands of the Yakama Nation. Archaeological surveying in the area shows no additional evidence from materials or engineering to confirm the discovery. Water levels, however, have not receded enough since 1984 to expose the terrace where the point was discovered. In the vicinity of the Salmon La Sac region lie prehistoric and early historic Native American sites including artifact scatter, petroglyphs, resource procurement areas, and seasonal salmon camps indicating that these may be associated with the Kittitas or other Bands and Tribes of the Yakama Nation.

Part of the land between Waptus River and Cooper River is private land, primarily for industrial forestry and occasional residencial subdivisions.

== Climate ==
Waptus Lake is located in a hemiboreal climate, part of the marine west coast climate zone of western North America. The average temperature is 3 °C. The warmest month is August, with an average temperature of 19 °C, and the coldest month is December, at an average of −8 °C. The average rainfall is 2687 millimeters per year. The wettest month is December, with 370 millimeters of rain, and the least in July, with 38 millimeters of rain.

Waptus Lake

Climate chart (precipitation, max. and min. temperature)
J	F	M	A	M	J	J	A	S	O	N	D
396 −1 −10	354 −1 −10	331 −4 −8	213 9 −4	165 15 −2	104 18 0	38 24 3	48 24 4	114 20 2	298 12 −2	353 4 −7	370 −1 −11
- █ Average max. and min. temperatures in °C
- █ Precipitation totals in mm
Imperial conversion
J	F	M	A	M	J	J	A	S	O	N	D
16 30 14	14 30 14	13 25 18	8.4 48 25	6.5 59 28	4.1 64 32	1.5 75 37	1.9 75 39	4.5 68 36	12 54 28	14 39 19	15 30 12
- █ Average max. and min. temperatures in °F
- █ Precipitation totals in inches

== Access ==
Bordering the Pacific Crest Trail, hiking to Waptus Lake is a popular activity. It is approximately 8 miles from the trailhead at Salmon La Sac Trailhead. The trail has a gentle grade for most of its length, with occasional steep hills. The follows a valley floor with old-growth forest, frequently crossing small snowmelt creeks. Mountain bikes are prohibited beyond this point of the wilderness boundary. The trail intersects Trail Creek Trail 1322 and then Waptus Pass Trail 1329 which lead to the lake over a bridge that was never replaced after a flooding of Waptus River. The trail continues shortly upstream as Waptus Horse Ford Trail 1329.1 and reaches the Pacific Crest Trail 2000. Downstream of Waptus Lake the river basin is characterized by steep slopes associated with some of the river shorelines. Other neighboring areas have relatively flat valleys with mature forest habitat.

== See also ==
- List of lakes of the Alpine Lakes Wilderness
