= Pete Lake =

Lake in Washington, United States

- Location within Washington (state) Location within the United States
- Location: Kittitas County, Washington
- Coordinates: 47.4757659°N 121.2359631°W
- Primary inflows: Lemah River
- Primary outflows: Lemah River
- Basin countries: United States
- Surface elevation: 2,986 ft (910 m)

Pete Lake is a small alpine freshwater lake located on the southern stretch of the Alpine Lakes Wilderness in Kittitas County, Washington. Because of its proximity to the Pacific Crest Trail and Cle Elum Lake and Kachess Lake, Pete Lake is a popular area for hiking, camping, and fishing. Pete Lake is a short distance and along the trails that lead to Spectacle Lake at the base of Chikamin Peak and Cooper Lake to the South. Trails for backpacking are well-trafficked and originally designed in some areas for enough buffer that allows mountain biking.

== Ecology ==
Pete Lake is located in a prominent valley that comprises the most significant waterway to the Salmon La Sac region. Pete Lake has a southeast output into Lemah River which shortly downstream is a tributary to Cooper River. Cooper River then drains into Cooper Lake at the northwest shoreline. The input of Pete Lake is the upstream flow of Lemah River from Lemah Mountain. Lemah River flows through the Cascade Mountain Range and has steep slopes associated with waterfalls in close proximity to the Pacific Crest Trail, including Whinnimic Falls and Lemah Creek Falls. While mining in the area surrounding Pete Lake and damming Cle Elum River downstream impacted the quality of the salmon habitat, salmon spawning has been prominent upstream of Cle Elum River since the late 2000s.

== History ==
A discovery in 1984 of a Clovis point projectile leads to suggestions that the region may have been a site of the residence of Indigenous peoples of the Northwest Plateau with Clovis culture, perhaps of the Wenatchi People, one of the Confederated Tribes of the Colville Reservation and within the ceded lands of the Yakama Nation. Archaeological surveying in the area shows no additional evidence from materials or engineering to confirm the discovery. Water levels have not receded enough since 1984 to expose the terrace where the point was discovered. In the vicinity of the Salmon La Sac region lie prehistoric and early historic Native American sites including artifact scatter, petroglyphs, resource procurement areas, and seasonal salmon camps indicating that these may be associated with the Kittitas or other Bands and Tribes of the Yakama Nation.

=== Name ===
Along with neighboring peaks and lakes, Pete Lake was given its name from individuals connected to exploring the area. Pete Lake is named after a packhorse ranger of the Forest Department involved with the trail that leads to the lake.

== Access ==
Hiking to Pete Lake is a popular activity. It is approximately 4 miles from Cooper Lake on Pete Lake Trail #1323 which has a gentle grade for most of its length, with occasional steep hills. The first 2.5 miles from Cooper Lake is a valley floor with old-growth forest, frequently crossing small snowmelt creeks. Mountain bikes are prohibited beyond this point of the wilderness boundary. The trail intersects Tired Creek Trail 1317 at 1.25 miles and then Pete Lake Tie Trail 1323.1 which zigzags uphill for 0.5 miles to Forest Road 4616 to gain access to the loop route for mountain bikes. Once at Pete Lake the trail makes a junction with Waptus Pass Trail 1329 around the north shore and uphill through bluffs and forest for 1.25 miles to a junction with Lemah Meadow Trail 1323.2, which leads to Lemah Meadows and a junction with the Pacific Crest Trail 2000.6.

== See also ==
- List of lakes of the Alpine Lakes Wilderness
