= Cooper Lake (Washington) =

Lake in Kittitas County, Washington, US

- Location within Washington (state) Location within the United States
- Location: Kittitas County, Washington, United States
- Coordinates: 47°25′39″N 121°10′39″W
- Primary inflows: Cooper River
- Primary outflows: Cooper River
- Basin countries: United States
- Max. length: 1 mile (1.6 km)
- Max. width: 0.2 miles (0.32 km)
- Surface area: 129 acres (0.52 km^{2})
- Surface elevation: 2,792 ft (851 m)

Cooper Lake is an alpine freshwater lake located on the southern stretch outside of the Alpine Lakes Wilderness in Kittitas County, Washington. Because of its proximity to Cle Elum Lake and Kachess Lake, Cooper Lake is a popular area for hiking, camping and fishing. Cooper Lake, where two-pole fishing is permitted, is stocked annually with Kokanee salmon and several species of trout fish. Cooper Lake is the starting point for trails that lead to other Alpine lakes in the vicinity, including the Pete Lake and Spectacle Lake at the base of Chikamin Peak.

== Location ==
Cooper Lake is located approximately 3.5 miles from Salmon La Sac road, east of Snoqualmie Pass and The Summit at Snoqualmie on Interstate 90. The trailhead to other lakes is located past the Owhi Campground on the northwest shore along Cooper River starting towards Pete Lake. Cooper Lake is two miles outside the Alpine Lakes Wilderness in the Okanogan–Wenatchee National Forest, on land managed by the National Forest Service.

== Ecology ==
Cooper Lake is located in a prominent valley, the lake stretches from northwest to southeast, approximately 1 mile in length and 0.2 miles wide. Cooper River drains into Cooper Lake at the northwest shoreline from small alpine lakes along the Pacific Crest Trail, including Escondido Lake. The output of Cooper Lake is Cooper River, a tributary of the Cle Elum River. Cooper Lake and River are designated as shorelines of statewide significance under the Shoreline Management Act. Most of the creeks in the watershed, composed primarily of National Forest lands will drain into Cooper Lake and River towards Cle Elum Lake. The Cooper River flows through the Cascade Mountain Range and has steep slopes associated with some of its shorelines. While mining in the area surrounding Cooper Lake and damming Cle Elum River impacted the quality of the salmon habitat, salmon spawning has been prominent on Cle Elum River since the late 2000s.

=== Fish ===
Construction of timber crib dams in 1904 and later replacement with storage dams, inundated and eliminated access for salmonids, including sockeye salmon, coho salmon, Chinook salmon, and steelhead trout, to a considerable amount of pristine, high-quality habitat above these dams.

Since 2005, the Yakama Nation has been conducting a coho salmon and sockeye salmon reintroduction program primarily to improve the health of the ecosystem for salmon above the Cle Elum dam. Approximately 2000 adults were released into Cle Elum Reservoir and approximately 500 adults into Cooper lake, captured from Priest Rapids Reservoir.

Cooper Lake allows year-round open fishing season, reporting brook trout, rainbow trout brown trout, kokanee salmon and cutthroat trout, mountain whitefish, dolly varden trout, westslope cutthroat trout, and eastern brook trout. The lake is closed to fishing for bull trout. Shoreline access is found on the US Forest Service campground, motorboats are prohibited by county ordinance. Two-pole fishing is allowed.

== History ==
Discovery of a Clovis point projectile along the bottom of Cle Elum Reservoir in 1984 leads to suggestions that the region may have been a site of the residence of Indigenous peoples of the Northwest Plateau with Clovis culture, perhaps of the Wenatchi People, one of the Confederated Tribes of the Colville Reservation and within the ceded lands of the Yakama Nation. Archaeological surveying in the area shows no additional evidence from materials or engineering to confirm the discovery. Water levels, however, have not receded enough since 1984 to expose the terrace where the point was discovered. In the vicinity of the Salmon La Sac region lie prehistoric and early historic Native American sites including artifact scatter, petroglyphs, resource procurement areas, and seasonal salmon camps indicating that these may be associated with the Kittitas or other Bands and Tribes of the Yakama Nation.

== Climate ==
Cooper Lake is located in a hemiboreal climate, part of the marine west coast climate zone of western North America, which under the Köppen climate classification, a subtype for this climate is a "dry-summer subtropical" climate, often referred to as "Mediterranean". The north-south orientation of the cascades acts as a strong topographical control of weather. Two main pressure systems affect the Cascades Range of Washington: the North Pacific High pressures and the summer Aleutian Low pressures. In both cases, the northwest of the Cascades is the point of origin of air and storms.

== See also ==
- List of lakes of the Alpine Lakes Wilderness
