= Glacier Lake (Washington) =

Lake in Washington, United States

- Location within Washington (state) Location within the United States
- Location: Kittitas County, Washington
- Coordinates: 47.4675292°N 121.2961742°W
- Basin countries: United States
- Surface area: 20.2 acres (8.2 ha)
- Surface elevation: 4,744 ft (1,446 m)

Glacier Lake is a small alpine freshwater lake located on the northern skirt of Chikamin Peak and Lemah Mountain in Kittitas County, Washington. Because of its proximity to surrounding peaks and mountains at the heart of the Alpine Lakes Wilderness, the lake is a popular area for hiking, camping, and fishing golden trout. Glacier Lake is a short distance between Chikamin Lake and Spectacle Lake at the base of Chikamin Ridge. The Pacific Crest Trail is a short distance from Glacier Lake as well as other Alpine lakes located in the vicinity. To the North is Avalanche Lake and Iceberg Lake at the base of Lemah Mountain.

== Location ==
Glacier Lake is located northeast of Snoqualmie Pass and The Summit at Snoqualmie, within the Alpine Lakes Wilderness, on land managed by the Okanogan–Wenatchee National Forest. Reaching the lake is only by foot starting on Surprise Creek Trail #1060 east of the old railroad settlement of Scenic, Washington. The trail follows Surprise Creek for nearly 5 miles until it reaches Surprise Lake. The trail eventually follows the eastern shore of Surprise Lake and leads to Glacier Lake after approximately 0.5 miles. There are numerous campsites available around Surprise Lake and Glacier Lake.

== Climate ==
Glacier Lake is located in a hemiboreal climate, part of the marine west coast climate zone of western North America. The average temperature is 2 °C. The warmest month is August, with an average temperature of 16 °C, and the coldest month is January, at an average of −8 °C. The average rainfall is 1687 millimeters per year. The wettest month is December, with 247 millimeters of rain, and the least in July, with 33 millimeters of rain.

Glacier Lake

Climate chart (precipitation, max. and min. temperature)
J	F	M	A	M	J	J	A	S	O	N	D
220 −6 −10	206 −4 −8	183 −2 −7	127 1 −5	84 8 1	65 13 5	33 21 11	42 21 11	94 15 7	165 7 1	223 −2 −4	247 −7 −10
- █ Average max. and min. temperatures in °C
- █ Precipitation totals in mm
Imperial conversion
J	F	M	A	M	J	J	A	S	O	N	D
8.7 21 14	8.1 25 18	7.2 28 19	5 34 23	3.3 46 34	2.6 55 41	1.3 70 52	1.7 70 52	3.7 59 45	6.5 45 34	8.8 28 25	9.7 19 14
- █ Average max. and min. temperatures in °F
- █ Precipitation totals in inches

== See also ==
- List of lakes of the Alpine Lakes Wilderness
