= Cle Elum (disambiguation) =

Cle Elum may refer to:

- Cle Elum, Washington
- South Cle Elum, Washington
- Cle Elum Lake
- Cle Elum River
