= French Cabin Mountain =

Mountain in Washington (state), United States

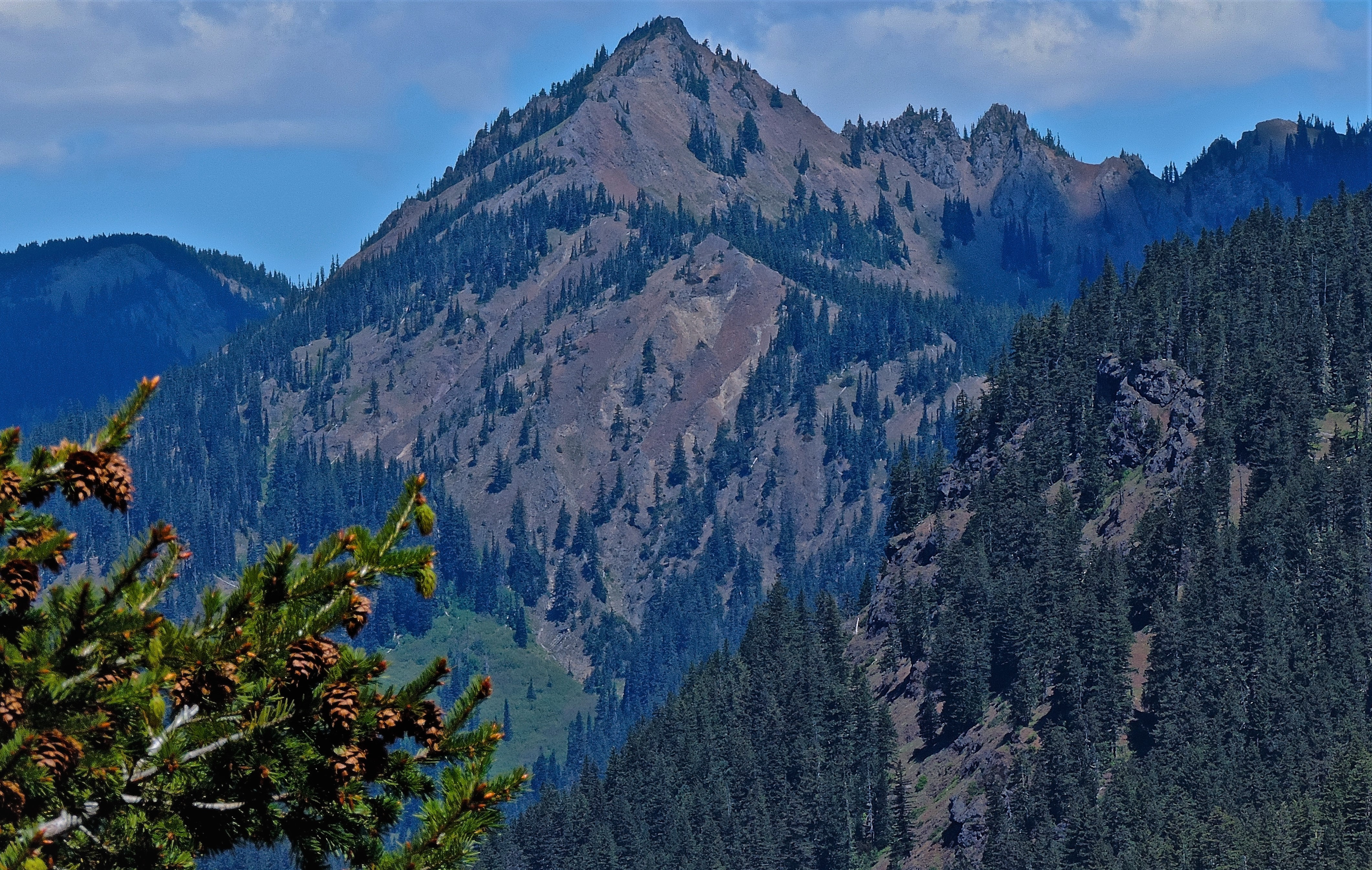
- South aspect of West Peak

Highest point
- Elevation: 5,724 ft (1,745 m)
- Prominence: 884 ft (269 m)
- Isolation: 2.33 mi (3.75 km)
- Coordinates: 47°19′14″N 121°10′54″W

Geography
- Location within Washington (state) Location within the United States
- Country: United States
- State: Washington
- County: Kittitas
- Parent range: Cascade Range
- Topo map: USGS Kachess Lake

Climbing
- Easiest route: class 3 scrambling

French Cabin Mountain is a triple-peak mountain located in Kittitas County of Washington state. The highest summit is West Peak, elevation 5,724-feet, the South Peak is 5,560-feet-elevation, and the North Peak is 5,498-feet. French Cabin Mountain is situated six miles north of Easton, between Kachess Lake and Cle Elum Lake, on land managed by Okanogan-Wenatchee National Forest. Precipitation runoff from the mountain drains north into French Cabin Creek and south into Silver Creek, which are both part of the Yakima River drainage basin. Topographic relief is significant as the summit rises 1,700 feet (520 meters) above Silver Creek in one mile, and the east aspect rises 3,400 feet (1,000 meters) above Cle Elum Lake in one and a half miles (2.4 km). French Cabin Mountain is the toponym officially adopted by the U.S. Board on Geographic Names, however "Frenchman Mountain" is a variant. West Peak is also an official toponym.

== Climate ==
Lying east of the Cascade crest, the area around French Cabin Mountain is a bit drier than areas to the west. Summers can bring warm temperatures and occasional thunderstorms. Most weather fronts originating in the Pacific Ocean travel east toward the Cascade Mountains. As fronts approach, they are forced upward by the peaks of the Cascade Range (Orographic lift), causing them to drop their moisture in the form of rain or snowfall onto the Cascades. As a result, the eastern slopes of the Cascades experience lower precipitation than the western slopes. During winter months, weather is usually cloudy, but due to high pressure systems over the Pacific Ocean that intensify during summer months, there is often little or no cloud cover during the summer.

== See also ==
- Geology of the Pacific Northwest

== Gallery ==
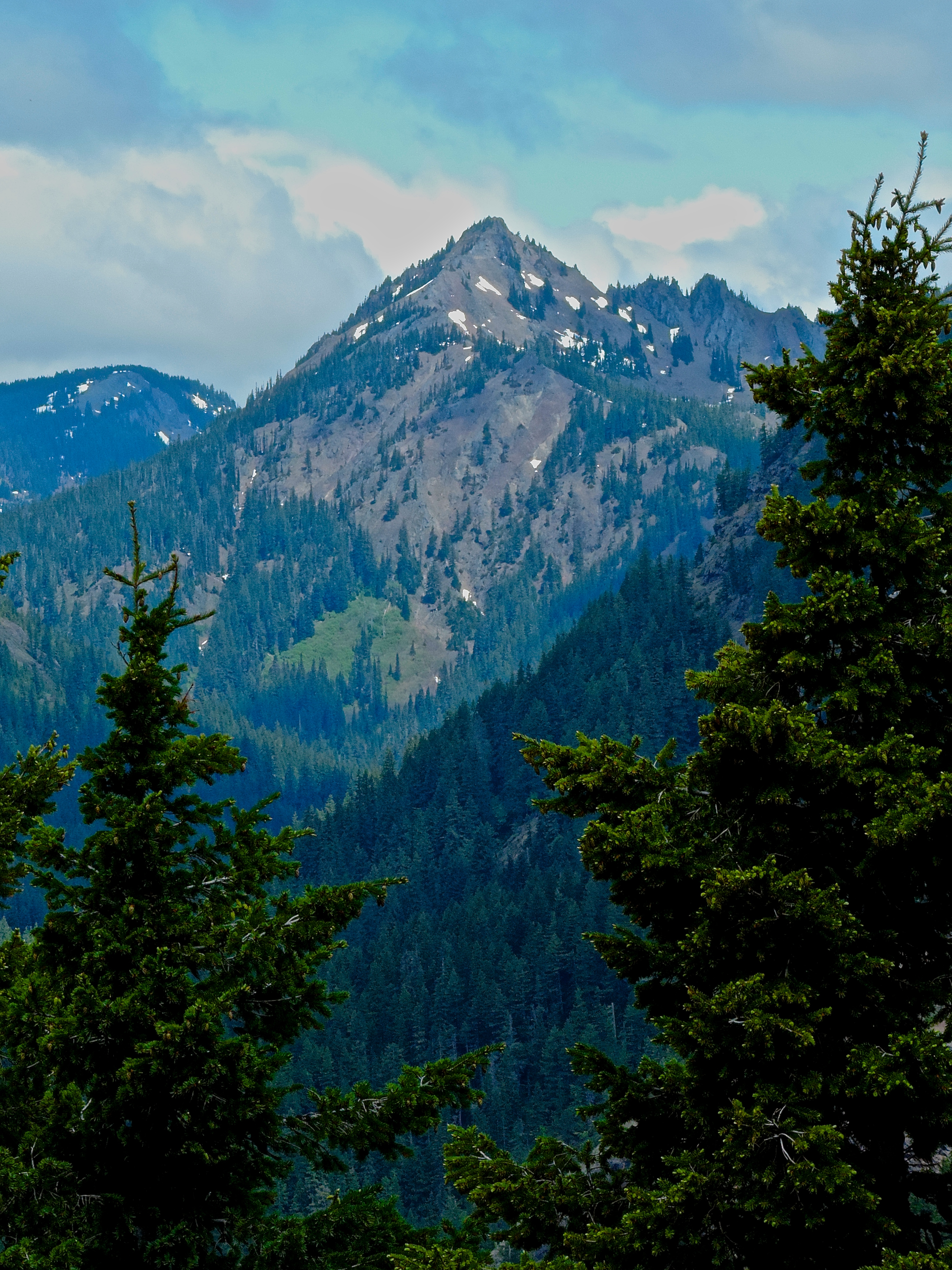
West Peak

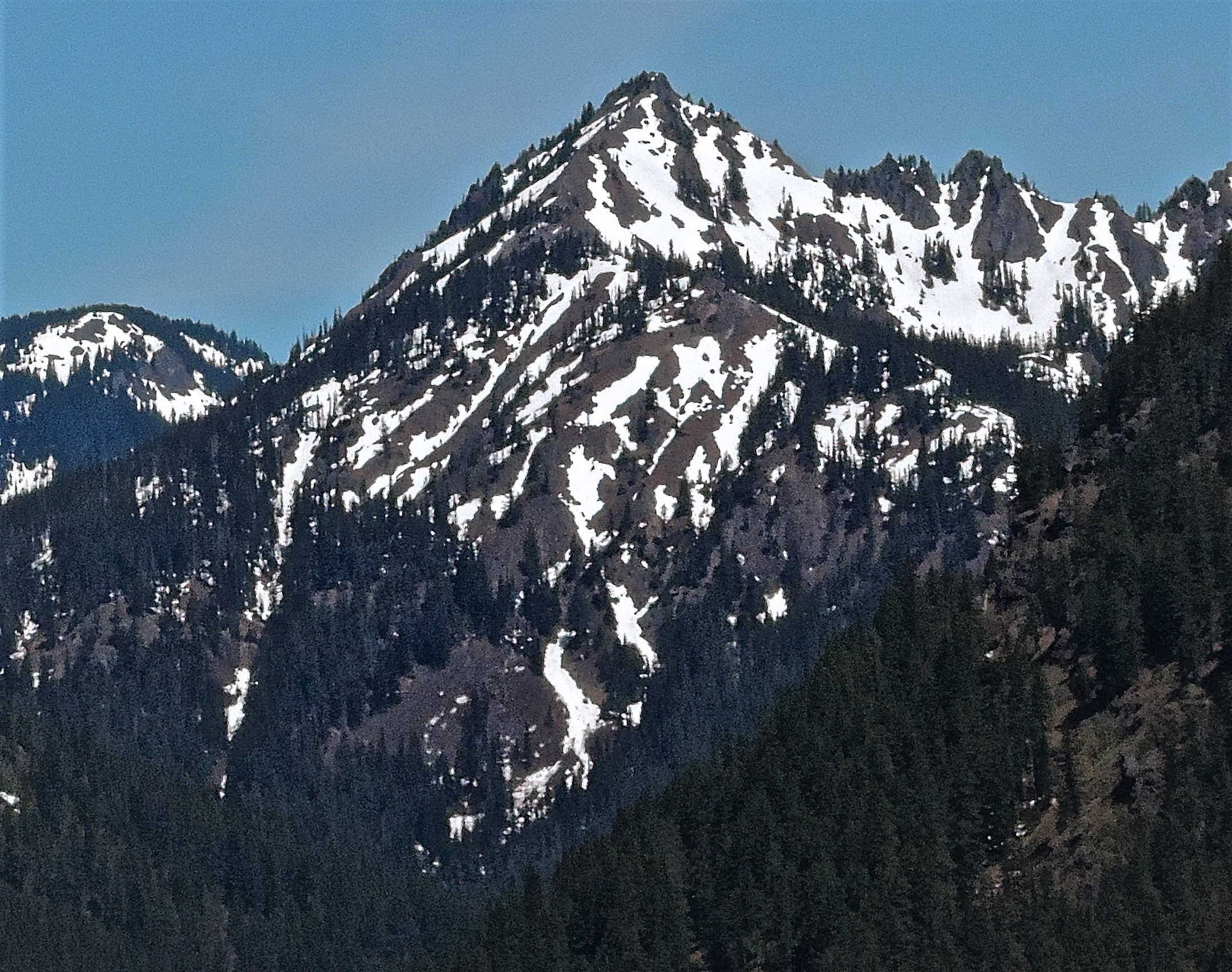
West Peak
