= Easton Diversion Dam =

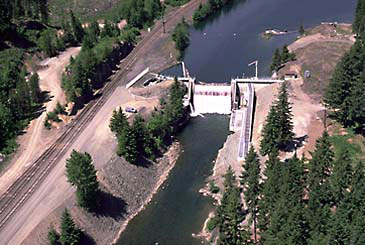
- Easton Diversion Dam
- Interactive map of Easton Diversion Dam
- Location: Kittitas County, Washington
- Coordinates: 47.241°N 121.187°W
- Construction began: 1928
- Opening date: 1929

Dam and spillways
- Impounds: Yakima River
- Height: 66 feet (20 m)
- Length: 248 feet (76 m)

Reservoir
- Creates: Lake Easton
- Total capacity: 3,992 acre feet

The Easton Diversion Dam is a diversion dam on the Yakima River in western Kittitas County near Easton, Washington. The dam is 66 feet (20 m) high, and 248 feet (76 m) long along the crest.

The dam was constructed in 1928-1929. It is currently owned by the Bureau of Reclamation and operated by the Kittitas Reclamation District.

== See also ==
- List of dams in the Columbia River watershed
