= Chikamin Lake =

Lake in Washington state, U.S.

- Location within Washington (state) Location within the United States
- Location: Kittitas County, Washington
- Coordinates: 47.4811913°N 121.3061493°W
- Basin countries: United States
- Surface area: 3 acres (1.2 ha)
- Surface elevation: 5,781 feet (1,762 m)
- Islands: 0

Chikamin Lake is a small alpine freshwater lake located on the northern skirt of Chikamin Peak and Lemah Mountain in King County, Washington. Because of its proximity to surrounding peaks and mountains at the heart of the Alpine Lakes Wilderness, the lake is a popular area for hiking. Other Alpine lakes are in the vicinity, including the Icebox Lake, Glacier Lake and Spectacle Lake a short distance South, at the base of Chikamin Ridge. To the North is Avalanche Lake and Iceberg Lake.

== Location ==
Chikamin Lake is located northeast of Snoqualmie Pass and The Summit at Snoqualmie. The trailhead is at Gold Creek Pond on the North shore of Keechelus Lake and South of Snoqualmie Pass on Interstate 90. It is situated within the Alpine Lakes Wilderness, on land managed by the Okanogan–Wenatchee National Forest.

== Climate ==
Chikamin Lake is located in a hemiboreal climate, part of the marine west coast climate zone of western North America. The average temperature is 36 °F (2 °C). The warmest month is August, with an average temperature of 61 °F (16 °C), and the coldest month is January, at an average of 18 °F (−8 °C). The average rainfall is 66.4 in (1,687 mm) per year. The wettest month is December, with 9.7 in (247 mm) of rain, and the least in July, with 1.3 in (33 mm) millimeters of rain.

Chikamin Lake

Climate chart (precipitation, max. and min. temperature)
J	F	M	A	M	J	J	A	S	O	N	D
220 −6 −10	206 −4 −8	183 −2 −7	127 1 −5	84 8 1	65 13 5	33 21 11	42 21 11	94 15 7	165 7 1	223 −2 −4	247 −7 −10
- █ Average max. and min. temperatures in °C
- █ Precipitation totals in mm
Imperial conversion
J	F	M	A	M	J	J	A	S	O	N	D
8.7 21 14	8.1 25 18	7.2 28 19	5 34 23	3.3 46 34	2.6 55 41	1.3 70 52	1.7 70 52	3.7 59 45	6.5 45 34	8.8 28 25	9.7 19 14
- █ Average max. and min. temperatures in °F
- █ Precipitation totals in inches

== See also ==
- List of lakes of the Alpine Lakes Wilderness
