= Kittitas =

Kittitas may refer to:

- Kittitas County, Washington
- Kittitas, Washington
- Kittitas (tribe)
