= Avalanche Lake (Washington) =

Lake in Washington, United States

- Location within Washington (state) Location within the United States
- Location: King County, Washington
- Coordinates: 47.4948614°N 121.3172495°W
- Basin countries: United States
- Surface area: 3 acres (1.2 ha)
- Surface elevation: 3,793 ft (1,156 m)
- Islands: 0

Avalanche Lake is a small alpine freshwater lake located on the northern skirt of Chikamin Peak and Lemah Mountain in King County, Washington. Because of its proximity to surrounding peaks and mountains at the heart of the Alpine Lakes Wilderness, the lake is a popular area for hiking. Other Alpine lakes are in the vicinity, including the Iceberg Lake a short distance East, at the base of Chimney Rock West. To the South is Chikamin Lake.

== Location ==
Avalanche Lake is located northeast of Snoqualmie Pass and The Summit at Snoqualmie. The NF Road 5620 runs along the middle fork of the Snoqualmie River East of the Snoqualmie Lake Trailhead and Middle Fork Campground. From Huckleberry Saddle, the route leads to Burntboot Creek, which is downstream of Avalanche Lake. Avalanche Lake is also a short distance from the Pacific Crest Trail North of Chikamin Lake and Peak. It is situated within the Alpine Lakes Wilderness, on land managed by the Okanogan–Wenatchee National Forest.

== Waterbed ==
Avalanche Lake sits in a bowl that collects water as inlets from snowmelt of surrounding peaks, including Lemah Mountain on the south. From the east, Chimney Rock and Chimney Rock West as well as Overcoat Glacier on Overcoat Peak melt into Iceberg Lake, a short distance from Avalanche Lake. The outflow of Iceberg Lake empties in Avalanche Lake, which has an outflow that makes Burnboot Creek, one of the main tributaries of the Middle Fork of the Snoqualmie River.

== Climate ==
Avalanche Lake is located in a hemiboreal climate, part of the marine west coast climate zone of western North America. The average temperature is 2 °C. The warmest month is August, with an average temperature of 16 °C, and the coldest month is January, at an average of −8 °C. The average rainfall is 1687 millimeters per year. The wettest month is December, with 247 millimeters of rain, and the least in July, with 33 millimeters of rain.

Avalanche Lake

Climate chart (precipitation, max. and min. temperature)
J	F	M	A	M	J	J	A	S	O	N	D
220 −6 −10	206 −4 −8	183 −2 −7	127 1 −5	84 8 1	65 13 5	33 21 11	42 21 11	94 15 7	165 7 1	223 −2 −4	247 −7 −10
- █ Average max. and min. temperatures in °C
- █ Precipitation totals in mm
Imperial conversion
J	F	M	A	M	J	J	A	S	O	N	D
8.7 21 14	8.1 25 18	7.2 28 19	5 34 23	3.3 46 34	2.6 55 41	1.3 70 52	1.7 70 52	3.7 59 45	6.5 45 34	8.8 28 25	9.7 19 14
- █ Average max. and min. temperatures in °F
- █ Precipitation totals in inches

== See also ==
- List of lakes of the Alpine Lakes Wilderness
