= Lake Easton =

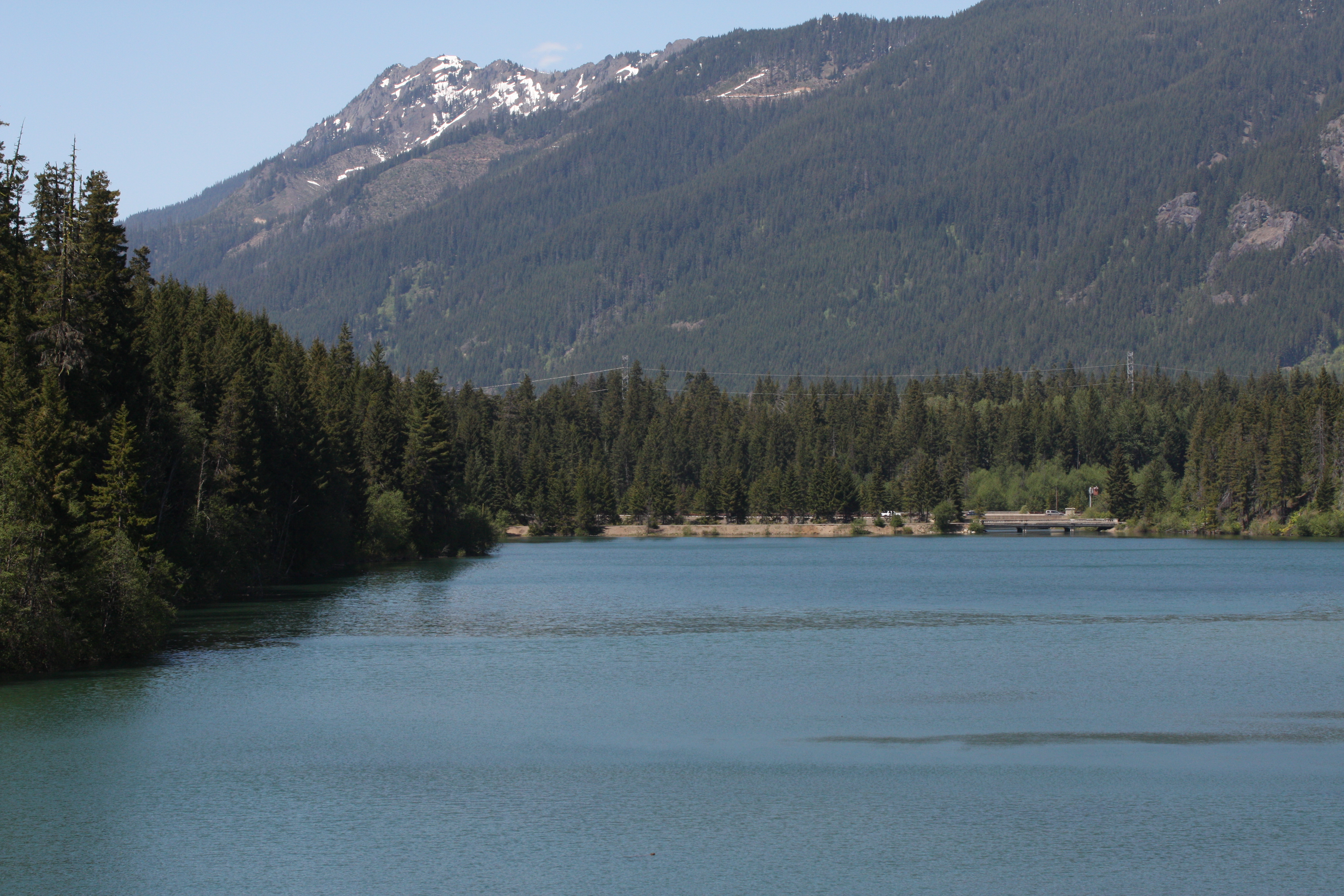

- Location within Washington (state) Location within the United States
- Location: Kittitas County, Washington
- Coordinates: 47°14′59″N 121°11′53″W
- Type: Reservoir, natural lake
- Primary inflows: Yakima River, Kachess River
- Primary outflows: Yakima River
- Catchment area: 185 sq mi (480 km^{2})
- Basin countries: United States
- Max. length: 1.25 mi (2.01 km)
- Max. width: 2,258 ft (688 m)
- Surface area: 204.8 acres (82.9 ha)
- Water volume: 4,000 acre⋅ft (4,900,000 m^{3})
- Surface elevation: 2,185 ft (666 m)
- Settlements: Easton, Washington

Lake Easton is a lake and reservoir along the course of the Yakima River in the U.S. state of Washington. It is located in Township 20N, Range 13E. The Yakima River flows into the lake from the west, and out to the southwest, through the 1929 Easton Diversion Dam. The Kachess River also flows into the lake from the north, where it effectively empties into the Yakima River.

Lake Easton is located south of Interstate 90 and northwest of Easton and is the primary attraction of Lake Easton State Park. Palouse to Cascades State Park Trail is immediately south of the lake. The lake is not stocked and has only fair fishing for rainbow, cutthroat and eastern brook trout after late May.
