= Easton, Washington =

- Census-designated place
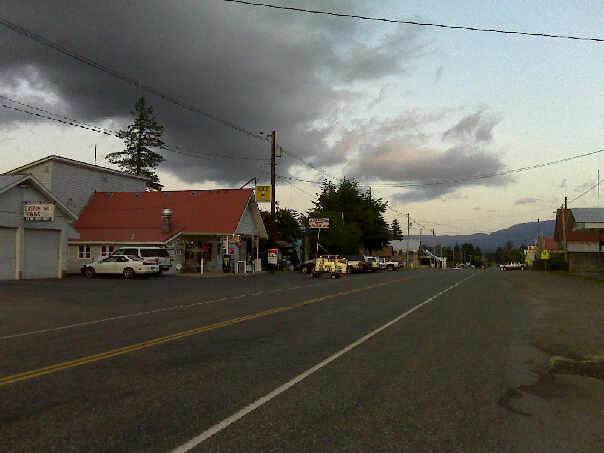
- Easton as seen from the west side

- Location of Easton, Washington
- Coordinates: 47°14′47″N 121°10′45″W
- Country: United States
- State: Washington
- County: Kittitas

Area
  - Total: 3.22 sq mi (8.34 km^{2})
  - Land: 3.21 sq mi (8.31 km^{2})
  - Water: 0.015 sq mi (0.04 km^{2})
- Elevation: 2,146 ft (654 m)

Population (2020)
  - Total: 407
  - Density: 127/sq mi (49.0/km^{2})
- Time zone: UTC−8 (Pacific (PST))
  - Summer (DST): UTC−7 (PDT)
- ZIP code: 98925
- Area code: 509
- FIPS code: 53-19700
- GNIS feature ID: 2408042

Easton is an unincorporated community and census-designated place (CDP) in Kittitas County, Washington, United States. As of the 2020 census, Easton had a population of 407. Easton is the annual site of the start/finish line for the Cascade Crest 100-mile ultra-running race.

== History ==
Easton was platted in 1902. It was given its name by the Northern Pacific Railway due its location near the east end of the Stampede Tunnel through the Cascade Range.

== Geography ==
Easton is located in western Kittitas County in the Yakima River valley. Interstate 90 passes through the community, with access from Exits 70 and 71. I-90 leads northwest over Snoqualmie Pass 70 miles (110 km) to Seattle and southeast 37 miles (60 km) to Ellensburg, the Kittitas county seat.

According to the United States Census Bureau, the Easton CDP has a total area of 3.2 square miles (8.3 km^{2}), of which 0.02 square miles (0.04 km^{2}), or 0.46%, are water. Lake Easton, a reservoir at the junction of the Yakima and Kachess rivers, and Lake Easton State Park are at the west end of the community.

=== Climate ===
Easton experiences a rare warm-summer Mediterranean-influenced continental climate (Köppen: Dsb) with warm (but not hot) and dry summers, and cold, snowy winters. In comparison with other areas in Western Washington, Easton is significantly colder and snowier during the winter, chiefly due to its high elevation, as well as to a lesser degree, its more inland position. However, just like most of Washington during summer, Easton is also influenced strongly by the Pacific high, resulting in a notable dry-summer trend. This combination of cold, snowy winters and dry summers is quite unusual and only found in a few isolated, high-altitude areas around the world.

Climate data for Easton, Washington, 1991–2020 normals, 1905–2023 extremes: 2170ft (661m)
Month	Jan	Feb	Mar	Apr	May	Jun	Jul	Aug	Sep	Oct	Nov	Dec	Year
Record high °F (°C)	52 (11)	61 (16)	68 (20)	80 (27)	92 (33)	107 (42)	99 (37)	99 (37)	93 (34)	83 (28)	62 (17)	58 (14)	107 (42)
Mean maximum °F (°C)	45.9 (7.7)	50.8 (10.4)	58.1 (14.5)	69.6 (20.9)	80.3 (26.8)	87.8 (31.0)	93.1 (33.9)	93.7 (34.3)	86.8 (30.4)	72.2 (22.3)	54.8 (12.7)	46.0 (7.8)	95.4 (35.2)
Mean daily maximum °F (°C)	35.5 (1.9)	40.1 (4.5)	46.0 (7.8)	52.5 (11.4)	61.0 (16.1)	66.9 (19.4)	75.5 (24.2)	76.1 (24.5)	69.0 (20.6)	56.0 (13.3)	42.5 (5.8)	35.2 (1.8)	54.7 (12.6)
Daily mean °F (°C)	30.0 (−1.1)	32.8 (0.4)	37.3 (2.9)	42.5 (5.8)	50.0 (10.0)	56.0 (13.3)	63.0 (17.2)	63.0 (17.2)	56.2 (13.4)	45.6 (7.6)	35.9 (2.2)	30.1 (−1.1)	45.2 (7.3)
Mean daily minimum °F (°C)	24.6 (−4.1)	25.4 (−3.7)	28.7 (−1.8)	32.5 (0.3)	39.0 (3.9)	45.1 (7.3)	50.5 (10.3)	49.8 (9.9)	43.3 (6.3)	35.2 (1.8)	29.4 (−1.4)	25.0 (−3.9)	35.7 (2.1)
Mean minimum °F (°C)	9.2 (−12.7)	12.0 (−11.1)	16.6 (−8.6)	23.6 (−4.7)	29.5 (−1.4)	36.8 (2.7)	41.9 (5.5)	41.5 (5.3)	34.1 (1.2)	23.6 (−4.7)	16.5 (−8.6)	10.3 (−12.1)	3.4 (−15.9)
Record low °F (°C)	−15 (−26)	−8 (−22)	1 (−17)	10 (−12)	20 (−7)	28 (−2)	25 (−4)	34 (1)	27 (−3)	8 (−13)	−4 (−20)	−6 (−21)	−15 (−26)
Average precipitation inches (mm)	8.13 (207)	5.84 (148)	4.94 (125)	3.42 (87)	2.21 (56)	1.77 (45)	0.71 (18)	0.87 (22)	1.88 (48)	4.93 (125)	7.77 (197)	7.37 (187)	49.84 (1,265)
Average snowfall inches (cm)	31.3 (80)	21.2 (54)	17.7 (45)	2.5 (6.4)	0.5 (1.3)	0.0 (0.0)	0.0 (0.0)	0.0 (0.0)	0.0 (0.0)	0.1 (0.25)	11.4 (29)	37.3 (95)	122 (310.95)
Average extreme snow depth inches (cm)	32 (81)	28 (71)	22 (56)	3 (7.6)	1 (2.5)	0 (0)	0 (0)	0 (0)	0 (0)	0 (0)	7 (18)	24 (61)	46 (120)
Average precipitation days (≥ 0.01 in)	20	16	20	17	14	11	4	4	9	15	19	20	169
Average snowy days (≥ 0.1 in)	10	6	6	2	0	0	0	0	0	0	4	11	39
Source 1: NOAA
Source 2: XMACIS2 (records, 2002-2020 monthly max/mins & snow)

== Demographics ==
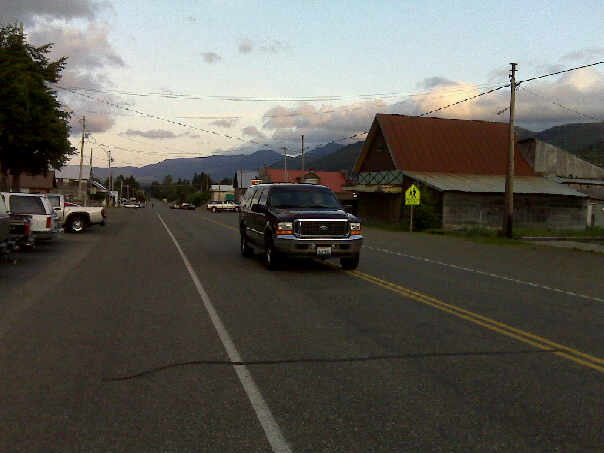
Some of the abandoned buildings in Easton

Historical population
Census	Pop.	Note	%±
2000	383		—
2010	478		24.8%
2020	407		−14.9%
U.S. Decennial Census; 1970 1980 1990; 2000 2010

Easton first appeared as a census-designated place in the 2000 U.S. census.

=== Racial and ethnic composition ===
Easton CDP, Washington – Racial and ethnic composition Note: the US Census treats Hispanic/Latino as an ethnic category. This table excludes Latinos from the racial categories and assigns them to a separate category. Hispanics/Latinos may be of any race.
Race / Ethnicity (NH = Non-Hispanic)	Pop 2000	Pop 2010	Pop 2020	% 2000	% 2010	% 2020
White alone (NH)	342	391	327	89.30%	81.80%	80.34%
Black or African American alone (NH)	0	0	0	0.00%	0.00%	0.00%
Native American or Alaska Native alone (NH)	3	4	0	0.78%	0.84%	0.00%
Asian alone (NH)	0	0	1	0.00%	0.00%	0.25%
Native Hawaiian or Pacific Islander alone (NH)	0	0	2	0.00%	0.00%	0.49%
Other race alone (NH)	0	0	5	0.00%	0.00%	1.23%
Mixed race or Multiracial (NH)	3	6	18	0.78%	1.26%	4.42%
Hispanic or Latino (any race)	35	77	54	9.14%	16.11%	13.27%
Total	383	478	407	100.00%	100.00%	100.00%

=== 2000 census ===
As of the census of 2000, there were 383 people, 151 households, and 104 families residing in the CDP. The population density was 227.3 people per square mile (88.0/km^{2}). There were 228 housing units at an average density of 135.3/sq mi (52.4/km^{2}). The racial makeup of the CDP was 91.91% White, 0.78% Native American, 6.53% from other races, and 0.78% from two or more races. Hispanic or Latino of any race were 9.14% of the population.

There were 151 households, out of which 35.1% had children under the age of 18 living with them, 54.3% were married couples living together, 7.3% had a female householder with no husband present, and 31.1% were non-families. 21.9% of all households were made up of individuals, and 4.0% had someone living alone who was 65 years of age or older. The average household size was 2.54 and the average family size was 2.94.

In the CDP, the population was spread out, with 28.7% under the age of 18, 7.3% from 18 to 24, 29.5% from 25 to 44, 23.0% from 45 to 64, and 11.5% who were 65 years of age or older. The median age was 35 years. For every 100 females, there were 124.0 males. For every 100 females age 18 and over, there were 125.6 males.

The median income for a household in the CDP was $37,708, and the median income for a family was $37,917. Males had a median income of $33,750 versus $20,357 for females. The per capita income for the CDP was $19,773. About 3.7% of families and 7.5% of the population were below the poverty line, including 2.7% of those under age 18 and 26.7% of those age 65 or over.

=== Notable people ===
- Sherwood Egbert, president of the Studebaker-Packard and Studebaker corporations

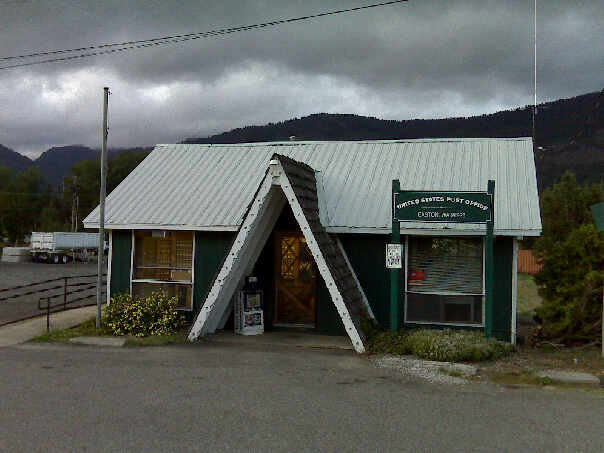
The post office

== Points of interest ==
- Lake Easton State Park
- Iron Horse State Park, former right-of-way for the Milwaukee Road which today serves as a path for bikers, hikers, cross-country skiers and horseback riders

== See also ==
- Kachess Lake
- Stampede Pass
