= Cle Elum, Washington =

- City
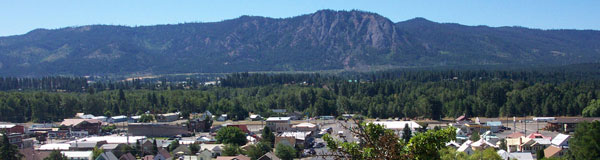
- Motto: "Heart of The Cascades"
- Location of Cle Elum in Washington State
- Coordinates: 47.195°N 120.939°W
- Country: United States
- State: Washington
- County: Kittitas
- Founded: February 12, 1902

Government
  - Mayor: Matthew Lundh

Area
  - City: 4.50 sq mi (11.65 km^{2})
  - Land: 4.49 sq mi (11.63 km^{2})
  - Water: 0.0039 sq mi (0.01 km^{2})
- Elevation: 1,909 ft (582 m)

Population (2020)
  - City: 2,157
  - Density: 480.4/sq mi (185.5/km^{2})
  - Metro: 41,765
- Time zone: UTC-8 (PST)
  - Summer (DST): UTC-7 (PDT)
- ZIP code: 98922
- Area code: 509
- FIPS code: 53-12945
- GNIS feature ID: 2409476
- Website: City of Cle Elum

Cle Elum (/kli ˈɛləm/ klee EL-əm) is a city in Kittitas County, Washington, United States. The population was 2,157 at the 2020 census. About 84 miles (135 km) by car from Seattle, Cle Elum is a popular area for camping and outdoor activities. It is also unofficially considered the starting point of Eastern Washington when driving east on I-90 from Seattle, although this is somewhat arbitrary since many consider either the town of Easton, anywhere east of Keechelus Lake, or the wildlife crossing bridge over I-90 to be the starting point.

The town takes its name from the Cle Elum River, which meets the Yakima River near here. The Kittitas band of the Yakama tribe lived here and fished the Yakima River. In the 1800s, settlers traveled through on their way to Puget Sound, and the Kittitas band was eventually displaced to a reservation. The settlement here had a large sawmill and a train depot, and the town was incorporated in 1902.

== History ==
=== Native history ===
Cle Elum was originally inhabited by the Kittitas band of the Yakama tribe. The tribe fished salmon, steelhead, and trout from the Yakima River. The Salmon la Sac trails in the northern area of the region were created by the Kittitas people and were used as layovers for journeys into the higher altitudes of the Cascade Range. In 1855, after the arrival of Catholic missionaries, and the passing through of settlers and coal miners on their way to the Puget Sound, a treaty resulted in the Yakamas ceding most of their land for a reservation in the lower Yakima Valley and guaranteed access to fish, including what would later be incorporated as Cle Elum. By 1859, the Kittitas had been forced to relocate to the Yakama Indian Reservation.

=== Early years and industries ===
In the spring of 1886, Northern Pacific Railway surveyors Virgil Bogue and Herbert Huson were making their way through the region with the intent of establishing a station. At the site of the future city, a depot was named Clealum after the Kittitas name Tle-el-Lum (tlielləm), meaning "swift water", referring to the Cle Elum River. Maps of the United States Postal Guide used two words while other early maps show it as one word: Clealum. In 1908, Clealum was altered to Cle Elum. The name was given to the river, the city, and Cle Elum Lake.

Walter Reed entered into a partnership with Thomas Johnson of Ellensburg and laid out sixty-five acres (26 ha) as a town site which was legally dedicated on July 26, 1886. Johnson had owned a sawmill on Wilson Creek, in Grant County and he moved the mill to the new location in the vicinity of the new town. The partners Reed and Johnson established what was undoubtedly the largest mill up to that time in central or Eastern Washington, cutting 40,000 feet (12,000 m) of board lumber per day. At the same time, Frederick Leonhard, who, with his brother-in-law, Gerrit d'Ablaing, had been carrying on a mill on Cooke Creek and later on the Naneum, moved to the vicinity of Cle Elum. They cut a large part of the lumber for the Stampede Tunnel.

=== The early 20th century ===
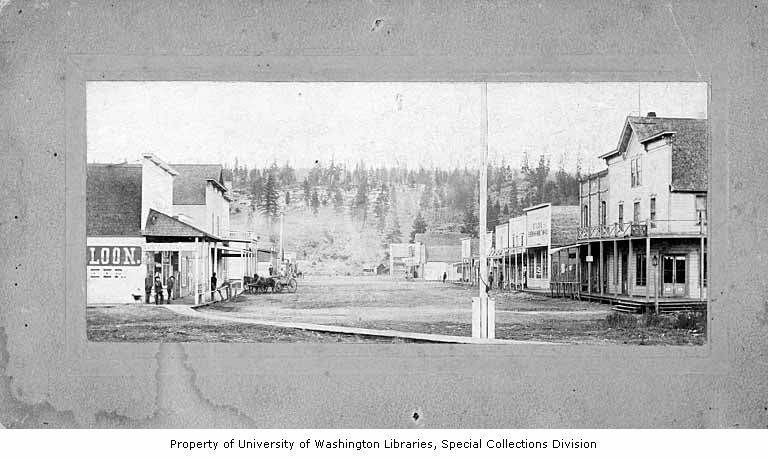
Downtown Cle Elum, early 1900s.

Cle Elum was officially incorporated on February 12, 1902.

Tragedy struck the area when on July 16, 1908, two carloads of blasting powder being unloaded by the Northwest Improvement Company exploded, killing at least nine people including miners, NIC store employees and a family with children living in a tent near the building. The explosion, located about three-quarters of a mile from Cle Elum's downtown, scattered debris and human remains and shattered windows across town. Accounts from residents equated the explosion to an earthquake.

In December 1910, loggers working for the Cascade Lumber Company near Cle Elum went on strike after the company reduced pay and began charging $5 per week for board. (equivalent to $173 in 2025)

In 1913, steps were taken to improve automobile access across the Cascade Mountains via Snoqualmie Pass. A $1,500,000 levy (equivalent to $48,900,000 in 2025) was approved in 1913 to improve and expand the state's highways. The largest project award from the levy ($590,743) went to construction of the Sunset Highway between Spokane and Seattle. This major cross-state highway would pass directly through Cle Elum's business district, and as it was one of the first towns reached after traveling east across the pass, would greatly benefit from its construction. That same year, reflecting on the prosperity of the coal mines, the city's second bank was chartered. By 1914, Cle Elum's population had risen to 3,000 from about 100 at the turn of the 20th century.

=== Great fire of 1918 ===
Cle Elum's greatest disaster occurred on June 25, 1918, when a huge fire wiped out over seventy acres of the city (29 city blocks) causing over $500,000 (about $10.7 million today) in damages. The cause was later determined to most likely to be a cigarette butt thrown into a pile of garbage behind a theater. Thirty businesses and 205 houses were destroyed, leaving more than 1,800 people homeless. Following the incident, aid from across the state began pouring in. The Red Cross brought tents from Camp Lewis to house displaced citizens while soldiers were sent from Ellensburg to guard businesses. Yakima and Portland also sent aid to the city. No people died in the incident.

High insurance rates on Cle Elum's many wooden structures inhibited many people from purchasing fire insurance. One of the few buildings in downtown Cle Elum to survive the fire was the Cle Elum State Bank Building, built in 1906; it still stands today. The rest of downtown was quickly rebuilt with brick and many of these buildings still stand.

=== Bankruptcy ===
In 2011, the city government approved a development agreement with City Heights, who sought to create a planned community with 962 homes on 358 acres (145 ha) in the Cle Elum area. City Heights announced in 2019 that it would begin construction of the development, named "Ederra", under the existing agreement, while the City of Cle Elum proposed new conditions to address various concerns. City Heights filed a lawsuit against the city government for a breach of the original agreement. An arbitrator ruled in November 2024 that the city government owed $22.2 million to City Heights for violating the agreement along with reimbursement of legal fees and other expenses. A 20-year payment plan with 6% monthly interest was proposed to cover the debt, which the city government could not pay with its existing revenue sources. As a result, the city council voted to seek Chapter 9 bankruptcy protection on January 28, 2025, ultimately filing for bankruptcy in June 2025. Cle Elum became the second city in Washington to file for bankruptcy after North Bonneville in 1991.

== Geography ==
Cle Elum is located 71 miles (114 km) ESE of Seattle, 45 miles (73 km) NNW of Yakima, and 35 miles (56 km) WSW of Wenatchee.

According to the United States Census Bureau, the city has a total area of 3.83 square miles (9.92 km^{2}), of which 3.82 square miles (9.89 km^{2}) is land and 0.01 square miles (0.03 km^{2}) is water. It borders South Cle Elum and Roslyn.

=== Climate ===
Cle Elum has a humid continental climate, Köppen subtype Dsb. The elevation is 1,909 ft (582 m) and temperatures are cooler than areas to the east. The coldest month is December, a trait common in the Pacific Northwest. But hot temperatures still occur, and not only in summer: on March 18, 1968, the temperature reached 95 °F (35 °C). Cle Elum, lying on the less extreme part of the Cascade Range rain shadow, also sees more precipitation than more arid regions to the east but also less than the areas to the west.

The climate has warmed in tandem with surrounding areas; climate data further back shows that winters were once colder, and that January was historically the coldest month.

Climate data for Cle Elum, Washington (1991–2020 normals, extremes 1899–present)
Month	Jan	Feb	Mar	Apr	May	Jun	Jul	Aug	Sep	Oct	Nov	Dec	Year
Record high °F (°C)	57 (14)	69 (21)	79 (26)	96 (36)	99 (37)	108 (42)	105 (41)	105 (41)	99 (37)	88 (31)	72 (22)	62 (17)	108 (42)
Mean maximum °F (°C)	47.8 (8.8)	51.5 (10.8)	63.5 (17.5)	73.7 (23.2)	84.1 (28.9)	88.5 (31.4)	95.3 (35.2)	95.7 (35.4)	88.4 (31.3)	73.2 (22.9)	56.1 (13.4)	46.9 (8.3)	97.7 (36.5)
Mean daily maximum °F (°C)	35.0 (1.7)	40.7 (4.8)	48.9 (9.4)	57.3 (14.1)	66.1 (18.9)	71.9 (22.2)	81.1 (27.3)	81.4 (27.4)	72.9 (22.7)	57.8 (14.3)	43.2 (6.2)	34.3 (1.3)	57.5 (14.2)
Daily mean °F (°C)	28.6 (−1.9)	32.2 (0.1)	38.3 (3.5)	45.1 (7.3)	53.3 (11.8)	59.4 (15.2)	66.9 (19.4)	66.3 (19.1)	57.8 (14.3)	45.9 (7.7)	35.4 (1.9)	28.3 (−2.1)	46.5 (8.0)
Mean daily minimum °F (°C)	22.2 (−5.4)	23.6 (−4.7)	27.8 (−2.3)	32.9 (0.5)	40.4 (4.7)	46.8 (8.2)	52.7 (11.5)	51.1 (10.6)	42.7 (5.9)	33.9 (1.1)	27.7 (−2.4)	22.3 (−5.4)	35.3 (1.9)
Mean minimum °F (°C)	5.1 (−14.9)	8.0 (−13.3)	17.6 (−8.0)	24.4 (−4.2)	29.0 (−1.7)	36.8 (2.7)	43.0 (6.1)	40.3 (4.6)	30.7 (−0.7)	21.4 (−5.9)	13.5 (−10.3)	8.3 (−13.2)	−0.7 (−18.2)
Record low °F (°C)	−33 (−36)	−30 (−34)	−3 (−19)	12 (−11)	19 (−7)	25 (−4)	30 (−1)	23 (−5)	12 (−11)	10 (−12)	−13 (−25)	−31 (−35)	−33 (−36)
Average precipitation inches (mm)	3.40 (86)	2.49 (63)	2.73 (69)	1.41 (36)	1.64 (42)	1.10 (28)	0.54 (14)	0.47 (12)	0.90 (23)	2.44 (62)	4.07 (103)	3.50 (89)	24.69 (627)
Average snowfall inches (cm)	23.2 (59)	14.0 (36)	6.3 (16)	0.7 (1.8)	0.0 (0.0)	0.0 (0.0)	0.0 (0.0)	0.0 (0.0)	0.0 (0.0)	0.3 (0.76)	9.0 (23)	21.8 (55)	75.3 (191.56)
Average precipitation days (≥ 0.01 in)	14.0	12.2	11.3	9.0	6.8	5.6	2.8	3.0	6.0	9.9	15.3	15.0	110.9
Average snowy days (≥ 0.1 in)	8.0	4.5	2.7	0.6	0.0	0.0	0.0	0.0	0.0	0.2	3.5	9.0	28.5
Source: NOAA

== Demographics ==
Historical population
Census	Pop.	Note	%±
1870	4		—
1880	543		13,475.0%
1890	243		−55.2%
1900	296		21.8%
1910	2,749		828.7%
1920	2,661		−3.2%
1930	2,508		−5.7%
1940	2,230		−11.1%
1950	2,206		−1.1%
1960	1,816		−17.7%
1970	1,725		−5.0%
1980	1,773		2.8%
1990	1,778		0.3%
2000	1,755		−1.3%
2010	1,872		6.7%
2020	2,157		15.2%
Source: U.S. Decennial Census

Since the 1980s, the Cle Elum area has become a satellite bedroom community for "super commuters" who work 85 miles (137 km) away in Seattle and other cities in the Puget Sound region.

=== 2020 census ===
As of the 2020 census, Cle Elum had a population of 2,157. The median age was 43.5 years. 18.6% of residents were under the age of 18 and 21.5% of residents were 65 years of age or older. For every 100 females there were 99.4 males, and for every 100 females age 18 and over there were 99.7 males age 18 and over.

97.0% of residents lived in urban areas, while 3.0% lived in rural areas.

There were 995 households in Cle Elum, of which 23.1% had children under the age of 18 living in them. Of all households, 40.7% were married-couple households, 23.1% were households with a male householder and no spouse or partner present, and 26.8% were households with a female householder and no spouse or partner present. About 34.5% of all households were made up of individuals and 14.4% had someone living alone who was 65 years of age or older.

There were 1,116 housing units, of which 10.8% were vacant. The homeowner vacancy rate was 1.1% and the rental vacancy rate was 7.1%.

Racial composition as of the 2020 census
Race	Number	Percent
White	1,879	87.1%
Black or African American	4	0.2%
American Indian and Alaska Native	16	0.7%
Asian	31	1.4%
Native Hawaiian and Other Pacific Islander	1	0.0%
Some other race	69	3.2%
Two or more races	157	7.3%
Hispanic or Latino (of any race)	145	6.7%

=== 2010 census ===
As of the 2010 census, there were 1,872 people, 857 households, and 500 families residing in the city. The population density was 490.1 inhabitants per square mile (189.2/km^{2}). There were 1,105 housing units at an average density of 289.3 per square mile (111.7/km^{2}). The racial makeup of the city was 92.1% White, 0.4% African American, 0.7% Native American, 1.0% Asian, 0.1% Pacific Islander, 1.7% from other races, and 4.0% from two or more races. Hispanic or Latino of any race were 5.8% of the population.

There were 857 households, of which 27.9% had children under the age of 18 living with them, 39.6% were married couples living together, 12.4% had a female householder with no husband present, 6.4% had a male householder with no wife present, and 41.7% were non-families. 34.2% of all households were made up of individuals, and 13.7% had someone living alone who was 65 years of age or older. The average household size was 2.18 and the average family size was 2.76.

The median age in the city was 41 years. 22% of residents were under the age of 18; 7.7% were between the ages of 18 and 24; 25.3% were from 25 to 44; 27.6% were from 45 to 64; and 17.4% were 65 years of age or older. The gender makeup of the city was 50.2% male and 49.8% female.

=== 2000 census ===
As of the 2000 census, there were 1,755 people, 792 households, and 1448 families residing in the city. The population density was 1,182.8 people per square mile (457.8/km^{2}). There were 956 housing units at an average density of 644.3 per square mile (249.4/km^{2}). The racial makeup of the city was 95.16% White, 0.51% African American, 1.03% Native American, 0.57% Asian, 0.85% from other races, and 1.88% from two or more races. Hispanic or Latino of any race were 3.36% of the population.

There were 792 households, out of which 67.4% had children under the age of 18 living with them, 63.1% were married couples living together, 10.9% had a female householder with no husband present, and 43.4% were non-families. 35.4% of all households were made up of individuals, and 16.2% had someone living alone who was 65 years of age or older. The average household size was 2.22 and the average family size was 2.87.

In the city, the population was spread out, with 23.2% under the age of 18, 7.6% from 18 to 24, 26.7% from 25 to 44, 24.6% from 45 to 64, and 17.9% who were 65 years of age or older. The median age was 40 years. For every 100 females, there were 93.1 males. For every 100 females age 18 and over, there were 92.3 males.

The median income for a household in the city was $28,144, and the median income for a family was $39,000. Males had a median income of $32,750 versus $26,645 for females. The per capita income for the city was $16,620. About 17.4% of families and 20.8% of the population were below the poverty line, including 22.3% of those under age 18 and 18.5% of those age 65 or over.

== Government ==
Cle Elum is classified as a Code city and has a non-partisan mayor–council form of government, with the mayor and seven council members elected at-large for staggered four-year terms. As of 2025, the city government has 29 employees and a general fund of $5 million. It includes a fire department and police department among other municipal services.

In June 2025, the City of Cle Elum filed for bankruptcy, citing insolvency due to an outstanding $26 million debt from a development dispute, after garnishments to seize bank accounts were initiated.

== Newspaper ==
- Northern Kittitas County Tribune

== Notable people ==
- Chuck Allen, American football player
- Champ Butler, singer
- Allen Larsen, ultramarathon cyclist
- Douglas Albert Munro, the first and only member of the U.S. Coast Guard to receive the Medal of Honor
- Dick Scobee, astronaut killed in the Space Shuttle Challenger disaster
- George Strugar, American football player
- Don Watts, American entrepreneur and founder of Swiftwater Cellars in Suncadia Resort
