= Northern Kittitas County Tribune =

- Type: Weekly newspaper
- Owner(s): Oahe Publishing
- Founder(s): Willard Chase
- Publisher: Jana Stoner
- Founded: 1953
- Language: English
- Headquarters: Cle Elum, Washington, U.S.
- Circulation: 3,000 (as of 2022)
- OCLC number: 18851452
- Website: nkctribune.com

The Northern Kittitas County Tribune is a weekly newspaper based in Cle Elum, Washington, United States. The newspaper is owned by Oahe Publishing.

== History ==
In 1896, the Cascade Miner was founded in Roslyn, Washington. It was created by J. B. Armstrong and L. W. Kribs. Three years later A. S. Randall became the owner in 1899. Randall and his brother started the Cle Elum Echo in 1902. The paper was originally going to be called the Clem Elum News, but the Echo was adapted at the suggestion of several prominent residents. About four months later the Echo was sold to Charles H. Freeman. Charles S. Fell owned the Echo for about six or seven years until his death in 1910. Randall continued to publish the Miner until 1912 when it was sold to George K. Aiken.

In 1922, the Miner and Echo merged to form the Cle Elum Miner Echo. Harry B. Averill published the paper for a decade. In 1926, he purchased the Mount Vernon Herald and then sold the Cle Elum Miner Echo to Joseph L. Ashbury. In 1928, P. D. Peterson purchased the Cle Elum Miner Echo. His son Vernon Don Peterson worked as editor from 1946 until his death in 1962. That year the paper was sold to Willard Chase. The paper was then absorbed into the Northern Kittitas County Tribune, who then moved into the Echo's office. The Tribune was established by Chase in 1953. The paper's name was changed in 1984 to the N.K.C. Tribune.
