= Baker Lake (Alpine Lakes Wilderness) =

Lake in Washington, United States

- Location within Washington (state) Location within the United States
- Location: Kittitas County, Washington, United States
- Coordinates: 47.3515°N 121.30172°W
- Primary outflows: Thetis Creek
- Basin countries: United States
- Surface area: 4.7 acres (0.019 km^{2})
- Surface elevation: 4,432 ft (1,351 m)

Baker Lake is a small freshwater lake located within the Alpine Lakes Wilderness in a valley on the northern slope of Keechelus Ridge between Keechelus Lake and Kachess Lake in Kittitas County, Washington, United States. Because of its proximity to Rampart Ridge, Interstate 90 and the cirque of Keechelus Ridge a short distance to the south, the lake is a popular area for hiking, swimming, and fishing brook trout, golden trout and rainbow trout. Access to Baker Lake is provided through Keechelus Ridge off Forest Road 126. A short distance southwest is Microwave Hill, which is named because of a microwave radio tower on its summit.

== See also ==
- List of lakes of the Alpine Lakes Wilderness
