= Lake Easton State Park =

State park in Washington (state), U.S.

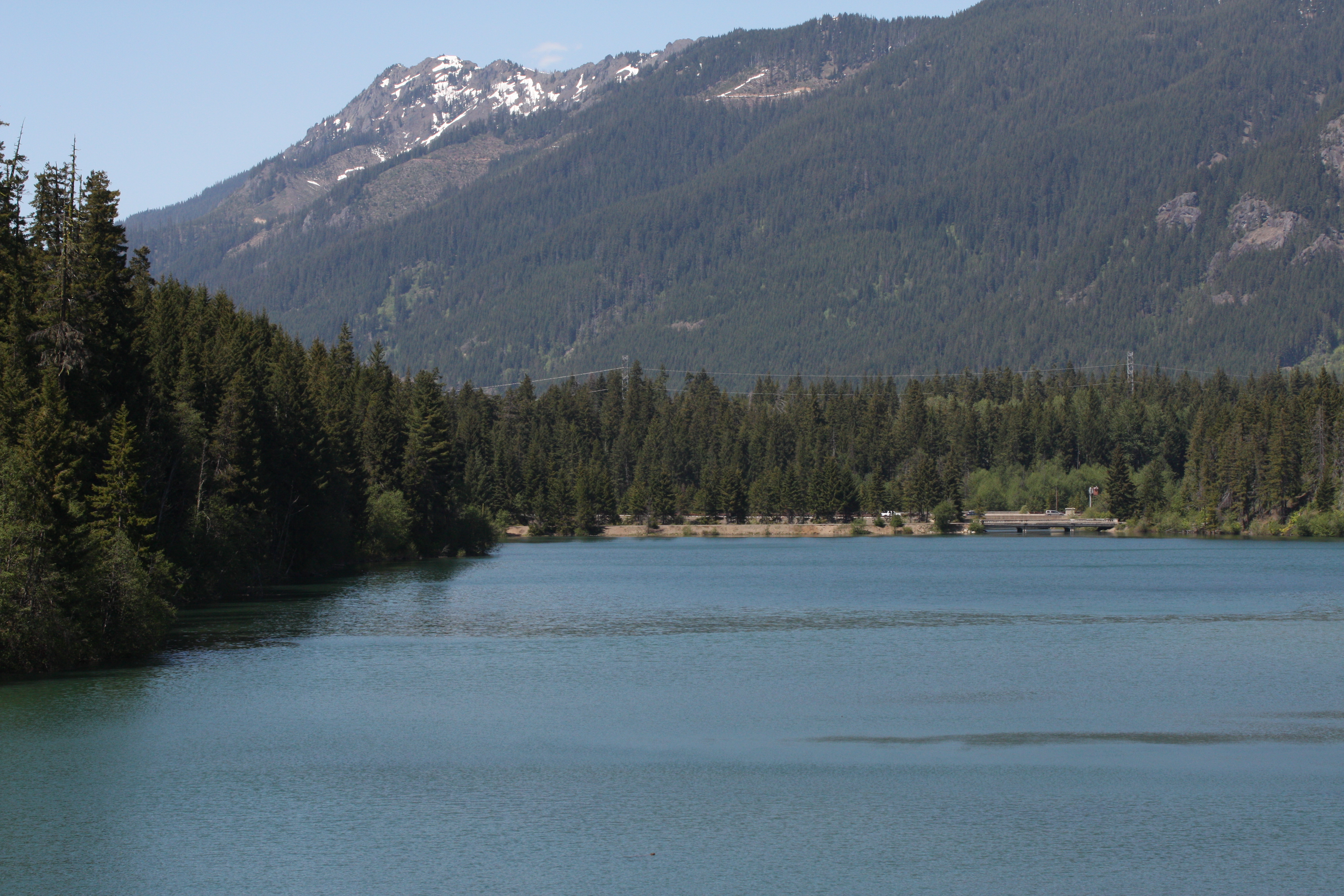
- View north across the west end of Lake Easton

- Location within Washington (state) Location within the United States
- Location: Kittitas County, Washington, United States
- Coordinates: 47°14′59″N 121°11′53″W
- Area: 697 acres (282 ha)
- Elevation: 2,185 ft (666 m)
- Established: 1961
- Administrator: Washington State Parks and Recreation Commission
- Visitors: 231,405 (in 2024)
- Website: Official website

Lake Easton State Park is a 697-acre (282 ha) Washington public recreation area in Kittitas County. The state park sits in the eastern foothills of the Cascade Range and has 24,000 feet (7,300 m) of shoreline on Lake Easton. Park activities include picnicking, camping, hiking, mountain biking, boating, fishing, swimming, cross-country skiing, snowmobiling, wildlife viewing, and horseshoes.
