= Washington State Growth Management Act =

The Washington State Growth Management Act (GMA) is a Washington state law that requires state and local governments to manage Washington's growth by identifying and protecting critical areas and natural resource lands, designating urban growth areas, preparing comprehensive plans and implementing them through capital investments and development regulations. This approach to growth management is unique among states. The act (RCW § 36.70A) was adopted by the Legislature in 1990.

The GMA was adopted because the Washington State Legislature found that uncoordinated and unplanned growth posed a threat to the environment, sustainable economic development and the quality of life in Washington.

Rather than centralize planning and decision-making at the state level, the GMA focuses on local control. The GMA establishes state goals, sets deadlines for compliance, offers direction on how to prepare local comprehensive plans and regulations and sets forth requirements for early and continuous public participation. Within the framework provided by the mandates of the Act, local governments have many choices regarding the specific content of comprehensive plans and implementing development regulations.

GMA planning requirements apply on a county-by-county basis. While all counties must adopt development regulations that designate and protect critical areas and designate natural resource lands, only some are subject to the rest of the planning requirements. Some counties, based on population and growth trends, had or have a choice whether to plan under the GMA process or the pre-GMA process; others do not.

A central feature of GMA planning is that counties designate urban growth areas (UGA) and must plan for all urban growth to happen in those areas alone. Cities are not allowed to annex and generally not even to extend urban services to places not within the urban growth area. The state forecasts population growth for each county and the county is required to designate where development to support the future population will happen.

The Growth Management Hearings Board hears and determines allegations that a government agency has not complied with the GMA or the related Shoreline Management Act (SMA, Chapter 90.58 RCW). A 1991 law amended the GMA to create three regional boards, but a 2010 law consolidated them into one. SMA jurisdiction was added in 1996. The board's administrative rules of practice and procedure are found in the Washington Administrative Code (WAC 242-02 ). Hearings Board members are appointed by the governor to staggered three year terms.

== Middle housing ==
In 2023, the Legislature passed HB 1110, commonly referred to as the "middle housing bill." This act requires all cities with a population greater than 25,000 allow development of duplexes on all lots and fourplexes within a quarter-mile of a major transit stop or if one of the units is affordable. There are stricter requirements for cities with a population greater than 75,000: fourplexes everywhere and sixplexes within a quarter-mile of a major transit stop or if two units are affordable.
