= Kachess River =

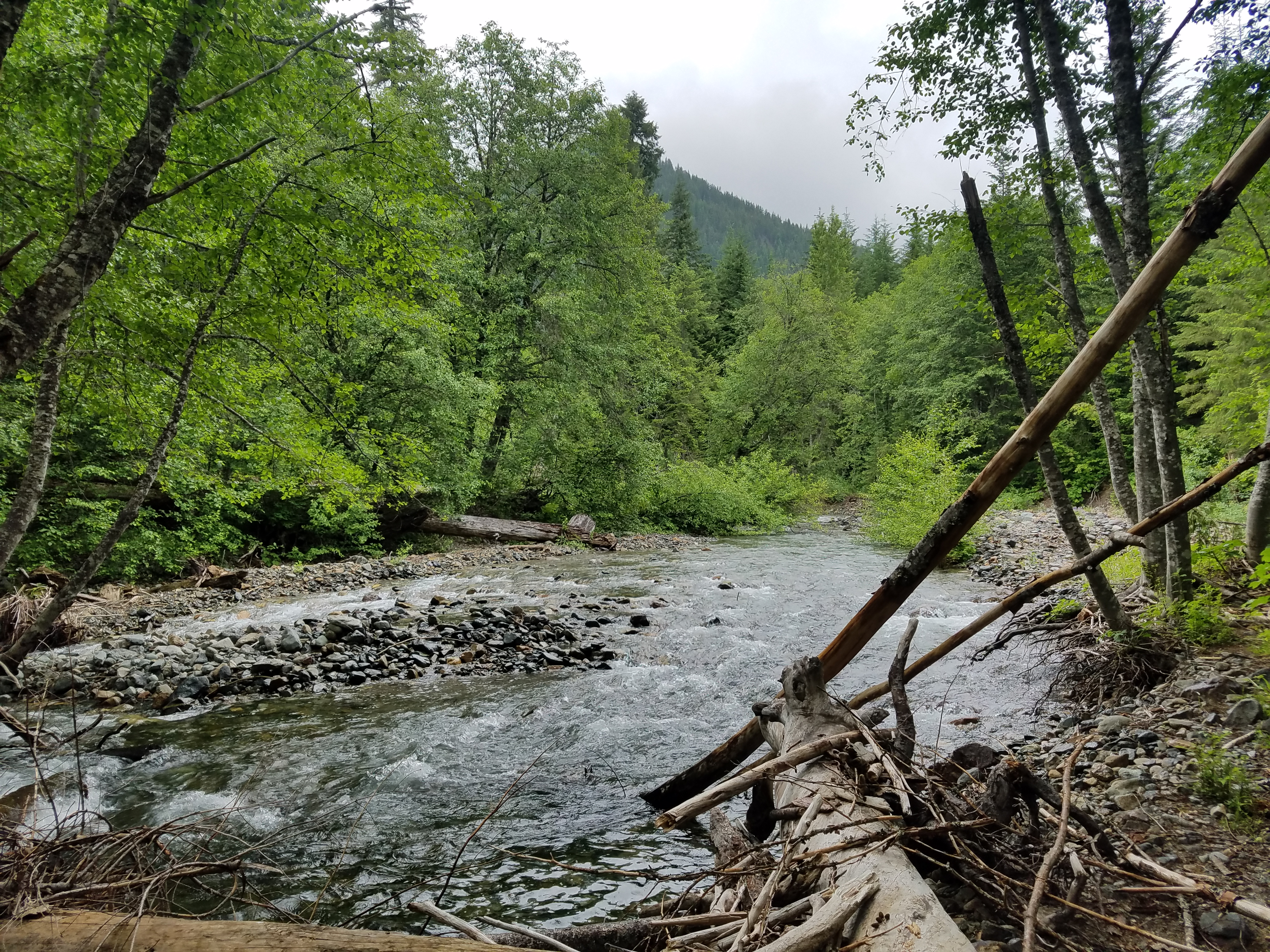
- Kachess River below Chickamin Ridge

- Location of the mouth of Kachess River in Washington Kachess River (the United States)
- Etymology

Location
- Country: United States
- State: Washington
- County: Kittitas

Physical characteristics
- Source: Cascade Range
  - location: Chickamin Ridge, north of Kachess Lake, Wenatchee National Forest
  - coordinates: 47°26′45″N 121°14′15″W
  - elevation: 4,857 ft (1,480 m)
- Mouth: Yakima River
  - location: Lake Easton
  - coordinates: 47°15′06″N 121°11′56″W
  - elevation: 2,185 ft (666 m)

Kachess River is a tributary of the Yakima River, in the U.S. state of Washington. From its source on Chickamin Ridge in the Alpine Lakes Wilderness region of the Cascade Range, the Kachess River flows south into Kachess Lake, a natural lake regulated as a reservoir by Kachess Dam. Below the dam, the Kachess River flows south and then empties into the Yakima River at Lake Easton.

== See also ==
- List of rivers of Washington (state)
- List of tributaries of the Columbia River
