= Spectacle Lake (Washington) =

Lake in Kittitas County, United States of America

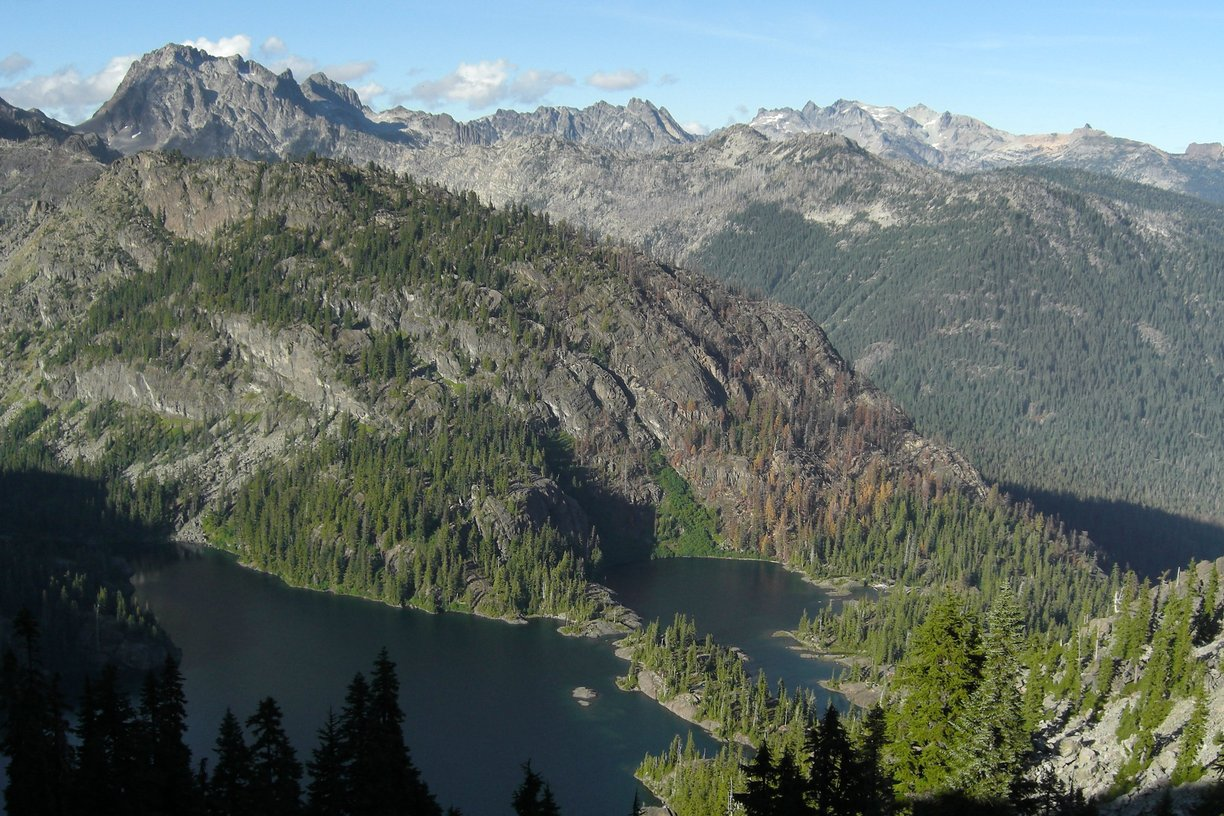
- Spectacle Lake viewing East towards Delate Creek

- Location within Washington (state) Location within the United States
- Location: Kittitas County, Washington
- Coordinates: 47.4618857°N 121.2807066°W
- Basin countries: United States
- Surface area: 77.8 acres (0.315 km^{2})
- Surface elevation: 4,265 ft (1,300 m)
- Islands: 0

Spectacle Lake is an alpine freshwater lake located on the northern skirt of Chikamin Peak and Lemah Mountain in Kittitas County on its western border with King County, Washington. Because of its proximity to surrounding peaks and mountains at the heart of the Alpine Lakes Wilderness, the lake is a popular area for hiking, camping and fishing cutthroat trout. Other Alpine lakes are in the vicinity, including the Chikamin Lake, a short distance North, at the base of Chikamin Peak. To the South is Hibox Mountain.

== Location ==
Spectacle Lake is located northeast of Snoqualmie Pass and The Summit at Snoqualmie. The trailhead is at Gold Creek Pond on the North shore of Keechelus Lake and South of Snoqualmie Pass on Interstate 90. It is situated within the Alpine Lakes Wilderness, on land managed by the Okanogan–Wenatchee National Forest.

=== Access ===
Spectacle Lake is by routes to Chikamin Ridge. The Pacific Crest Trail snakes north and south of Chikmain Ridge. Access is also reached by way of Mineral Creek Trail, or the much shorter trail that starts from the trailhead near Owhi Campground at Cooper Lake. Cooper Lake is stoked is stocked annually with several species of trout fish.

Cooper Lake leads to a relatively flat trail up to highly trafficked Pete Lake, four miles away. The trail borders the north shore of Pete Lake, approximately one mile from Pete Lake is Lemah Creek within the Lemah Meadows. The trail crosses to join the Pacific Crest Trail 2000.6, the location of the Lemah Creek fire of 2009, ending on the main Pacific Crest Trail 2000. The trails are located through several switchbacks and creek crossings, including Delate Creek over a large wooden bridge.

== Climate ==
Spectacle Lake is located in a hemiboreal climate, part of the marine west coast climate zone of western North America. The average temperature is 2 °C. The warmest month is August, with an average temperature of 16 °C, and the coldest month is January, at an average of −8 °C. The average rainfall is 2687 millimeters per year. The wettest month is December, with 396 millimeters of rain, and the least in July, with 38 millimeters of rain.

Spectacle Lake

Climate chart (precipitation, max. and min. temperature)
J	F	M	A	M	J	J	A	S	O	N	D
396 −1 −10	354 −1 −10	331 −4 −8	213 9 −4	165 15 −2	104 18 0	38 24 3	48 24 4	114 20 2	298 12 −2	353 4 −7	370 −1 −11
- █ Average max. and min. temperatures in °C
- █ Precipitation totals in mm
Imperial conversion
J	F	M	A	M	J	J	A	S	O	N	D
16 30 14	14 30 14	13 25 18	8.4 48 25	6.5 59 28	4.1 64 32	1.5 75 37	1.9 75 39	4.5 68 36	12 54 28	14 39 19	15 30 12
- █ Average max. and min. temperatures in °F
- █ Precipitation totals in inches

== See also ==
- List of lakes of the Alpine Lakes Wilderness
