= Cle Elum River =

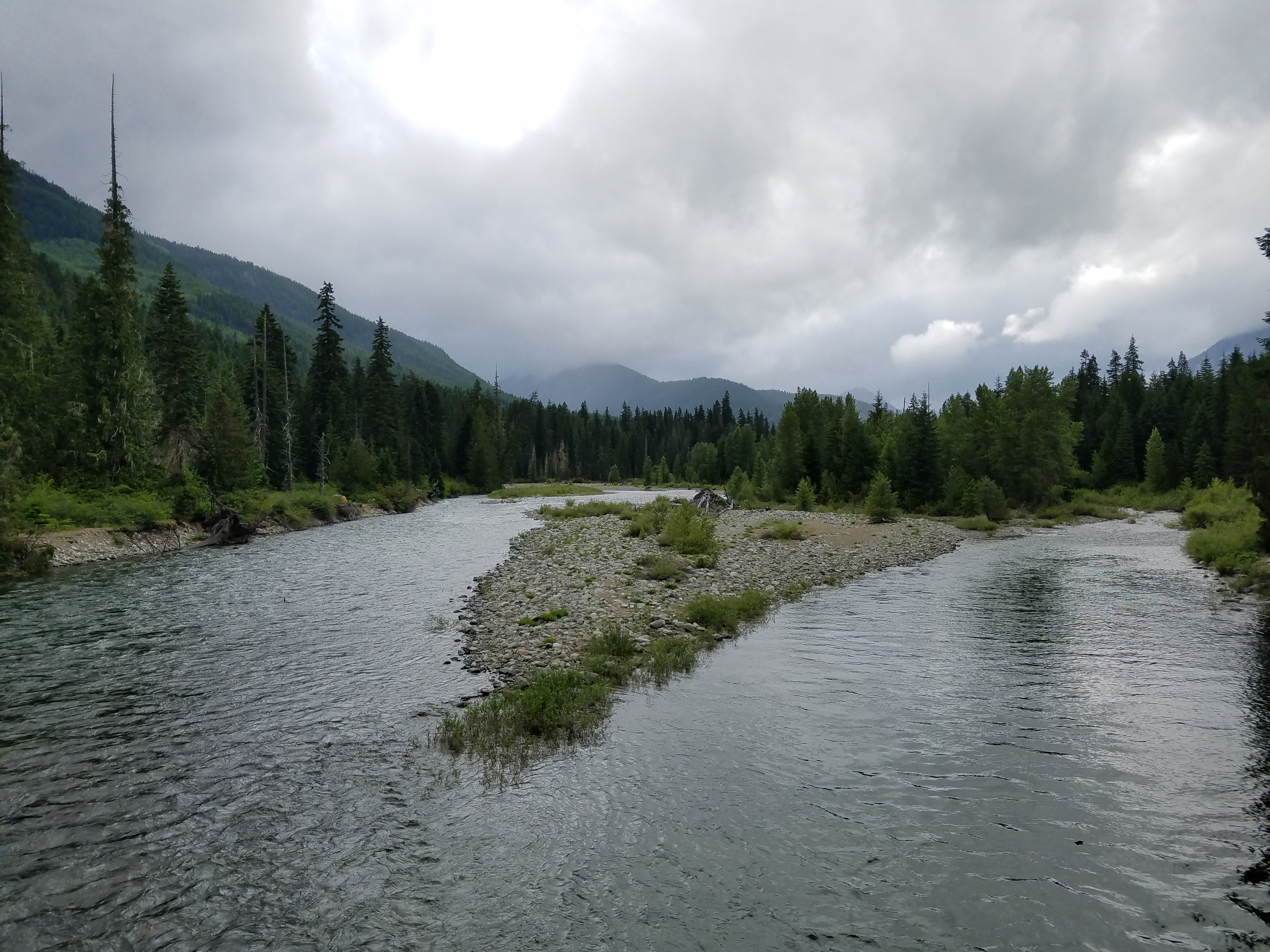
- Cle Elum River north of Cle Elum Lake

Location
- Country: United States
- State: Washington
- Region: Kittitas County
- City: Cle Elum

Physical characteristics
- Source: Cascade Range
  - coordinates: 47°35′19″N 121°10′1″W
  - elevation: 6,115 ft (1,864 m)
- Mouth: Yakima River
  - coordinates: 47°10′37″N 120°59′49″W
  - elevation: 1,990 ft (610 m)
- Length: 28 mi (45 km)
- Discharge
  - location: Roslyn, Washington
  - average: 945 cuft/s

Basin features
- Tributaries
  - right: Waptus River, Cooper River

The Cle Elum River is a tributary of the Yakima River, approximately 28 miles (45 km) long in the U.S. state of Washington. A Northern Pacific Railway station at the future site of the city of Cle Elum, Washington was named Clealum after the Kittitas name Tie-el-Lum, meaning "swift water", referring to the Cle Elum River. In 1908, Clealum was altered to Cle Elum. This spelling came to be used for the river as well. Some maps in the 1850s also have the river labeled as Samahma River.

== Course ==
The river originates in the Cascade Range near Mount Daniel and flows generally south, through Hyas Lake. The river is joined by many tributary streams including Waptus River and Cooper River draining from Cooper Lake, after which it enters Cle Elum Lake. Although a natural lake, Cle Elum Lake's water level and discharge is controlled by Cle Elum Dam, a 165-foot (50 m) high earthfill structure built in 1933. The dam and lake are managed for irrigation purposes by the United States Bureau of Reclamation as part of the Yakima Project. Below the dam, Cle Elum River continues south to join the Yakima River on the west side of the city of Cle Elum.

== See also ==
- List of rivers of Washington (state)
- List of tributaries of the Columbia River
