= Kittitas people =

Ethnic group

Kittitas
Pshwánapam
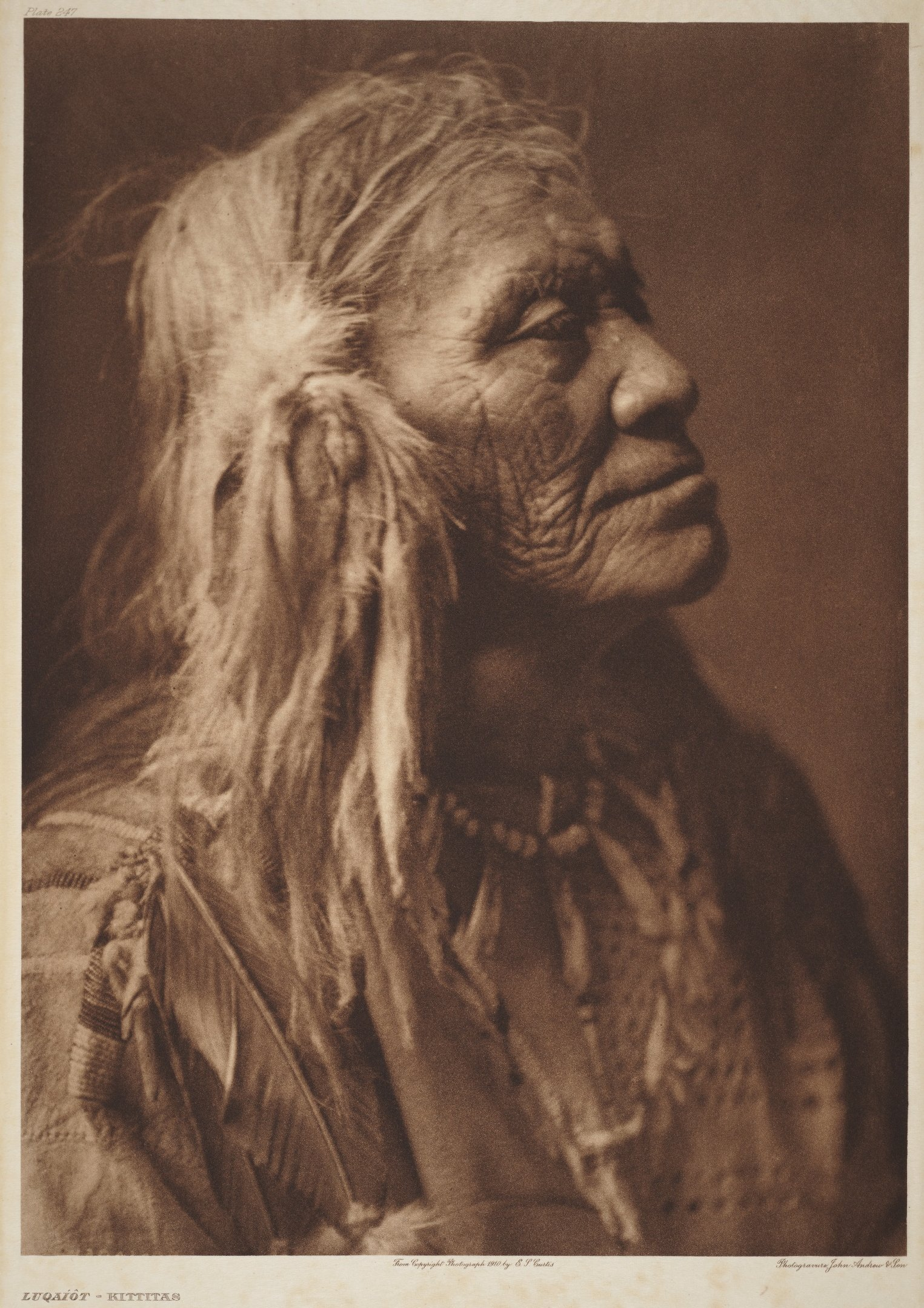
- Luqaiot, Kittitas chief

Languages
- Sahaptin (Yakama dialect)

Related ethnic groups
- Yakama, other Sahaptin groups

The Kittitas (Sahaptin: Pshwánapam, pronounced [ˈpʃwanapam]; also known as the Upper Yakama) are a Sahaptin tribe closely related to the Yakama, sometimes described as a band or subtribe of the Yakama. Their traditional territories are found within Kittitas and Yakima counties within Washington state, chiefly in the Kittitas Valley, Naches Valley, Wenas Valley, and upper Yakima Valley. Individuals of Kittitas descent are today enrolled in the Confederated Tribes and Bands of the Yakima and the Confederated Tribes of the Colville Reservation, but the Kittitas are not recognized as a distinct band by either tribal government.

== Etymology ==
Kittitas is derived from the Sahaptin toponym k'ɨtɨtáš "gravel bank place", referring to a location along the banks of the Yakima River. Pshwánapam ("rock people") is the common Sahaptin endonym for the group, formerly transliterated as Pisch-wan-wap-pam. Kittitas County is named for the tribe.

== History ==
The Kittitas traditionally occupied an intermediary role between other Plateau groups and the Coast Salish groups west of the Cascades. The course of the upper Yakima in the Kittitas Valley offered access to Snoqualmie Pass and Stampede Pass, both used as trade routes to the Puget lowlands. The Kittitas acquired horses by the 1730s, and traded for cattle and western vegetables with the Hudson's Bay Company outpost at Fort Nisqually.

During the 1804-1806 expedition, Lewis and Clark referred to the Kittitas as the 'Shan-wap-pom'.

Fur trader Alexander Ross was the first European to enter the Kittitas Valley, encountering a large tribal gathering in 1814.

This mammoth camp could not have contained less than 3000 men, exclusive of women and children, and treble that number of horses. It was a grand and imposing sight in the wilderness, covering more than six miles in every direction. Councils, root gathering, hunting, horse-racing, foot-racing, gambling, singing, dancing, drumming, yelling, and a thousand other things which I cannot mention, were going on around us.

In December 1847, Chief Owhi visited Old Fort Walla Walla and requested missionaries to be sent to the Yakama and Kittitas. A small group of Catholic missionaries arrived the following year and constructed the one-room Immaculate Conception Mission on Manastash Creek in July 1848. Father Pandosy headed the mission, but fell into poverty and mental disturbance, and was recalled to the Yakima Valley in September 1849.

The Kittitas were removed from Wenas Valley in 1858. White settlers entered the Kittitas Valley in the early 1860s, and the Kittitas were removed to the Yakama Indian Reservation.

== Geography ==
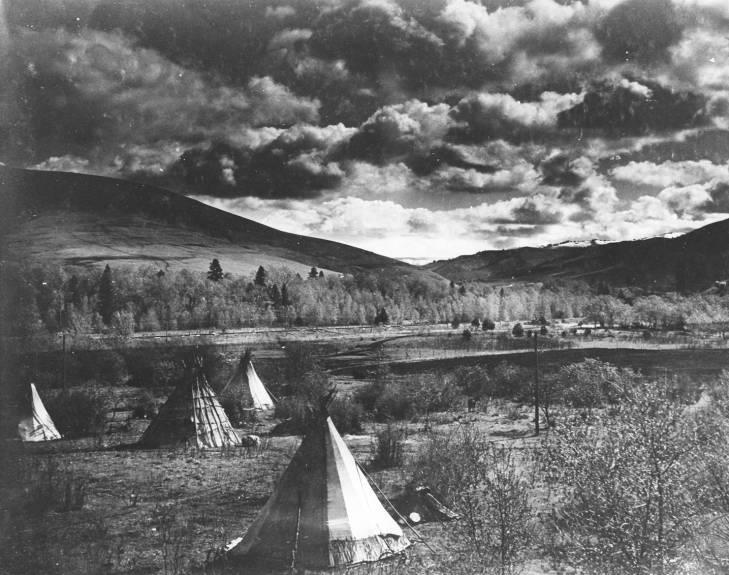
Kittitas camped at Taneum Creek near Ellensburg, 1900–1909.

Kittitas villages were located along the Upper Yakima and adjacent streams and rivers. Most had Sahaptin names, but two (N'tsamtsa'mtcin and Tc'kla'xan) are Interior Salish toponyms.

- A'tca – village located on the east bank of the Yakima river at Thrall
- K'tɨ'taas – large village located on the west bank of the Yakima two miles below Ellensburg. Population of 300 to 400 in summer, when largest.
- Yuúmaash – large winter village located on the east bank of the Yakima four miles below Thorp, with a population of around 400.
- Ktłáktła – located 2 3/4 mile on a straight line above Thorp, at the mouth of Taneum Creek. Largest permanent population of all Kittitas villages, roughly 500.
- Ti'plas – Located at the mouth of Swauk Creek between Thorp and Teanaway. Permanent population of roughly 50.
- Tyánanish – permanent village at the confluence of the Teanaway with the Yakima. Permanent population of roughly 50, but attracted more during fall hunting.
- Tatx̣anísha – at Indian John Hill four miles below Cle Elum. Village population of 50–60.
- Tlyálɨm – Large village at the south end of Cle Elum Lake along the Cle Elum River. Large salmon traps lead to populations exceeding 1,000 during early summer, with a smaller population staying year-round.
- Naánɨm – Large permanent village on Naneum Creek, seven miles northwest of Ellensburg. Population of roughly 400.
- N'tsamtsa'mtcin and Tc'kla'xan – Two closely located villages at the site of Kittitas. Populated during May and June for root digging.
