= Kachess Lake =

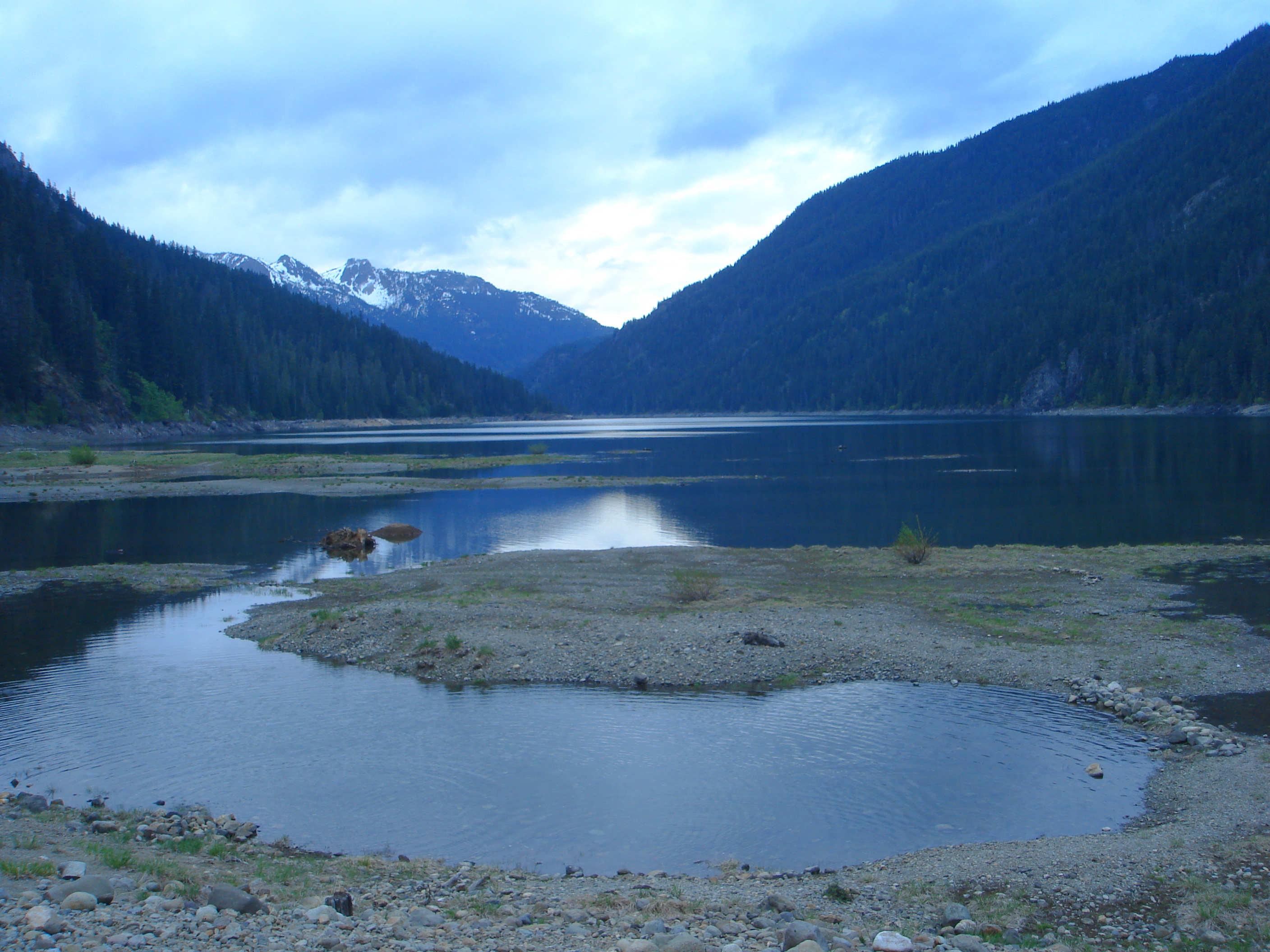

- Location within Washington (state) Location within the United States
- Location: Kittitas County, Washington, United States
- Coordinates: 47°15′51″N 121°12′21″W
- Type: reservoir, natural lake
- Primary inflows: Kachess River
- Primary outflows: Kachess River
- Catchment area: 63 sq mi (160 km^{2})
- Basin countries: United States
- Max. length: 9.6 mi (15.4 km)
- Max. width: 1.2 mi (1.9 km)
- Max. depth: 430 ft (130 m)
- Water volume: 238,000 acre⋅ft (294,000,000 m^{3})
- Surface elevation: 2,254 ft (687 m)

Kachess Lake (/kʌtʃis/) is a lake and reservoir along the course of the Kachess River in Kittitas County, Washington, United States. The upper part of the lake, north of a narrows, is called Little Kachess Lake. The Kachess River flows into the lake from the north, and out from the south. Kachess Lake is the middle of the three large lakes which straddle Interstate 90 north of the Yakima River in the Cascade Range. The other two are Cle Elum Lake, the easternmost which is also north of I-90 and Keechelus Lake, the westernmost, which is south of I-90.

Kachess Lake is part of the Columbia River basin, the Kachess River being a tributary of the Yakima River, which is a tributary to the Columbia River.

The lake is used as a storage reservoir for the Yakima Project, an irrigation project run by the United States Bureau of Reclamation. Although a natural lake, Kachess Lake's capacity and discharge is controlled by Kachess Dam, a 115-foot (35 m) high earthfill structure built in 1912. The discharge channel for Kachess Reservoir is 2,877 feet (877 m) long and was constructed from the natural lake to the intake structure of the dam's outlet works, approximately 1,800 feet (550 m) downstream and at a lower elevation than the original lake outlet. The intent of the lowered outlet works was to put all of the average annual runoff into service by adding an additional 76,000 acre⋅ft (94 million m^{3}) of natural lake water. As a storage reservoir, Kachess Lake's active capacity is 239,000 acre⋅ft (295 million m^{3}).

The name Kachess comes from a Native American term meaning "more fish", in contrast to Keechelus Lake, whose name means "few fish".

== See also ==
- Baker Lake (Alpine Lakes Wilderness)
