= Cle Elum Lake =

Lake in Washington, United States

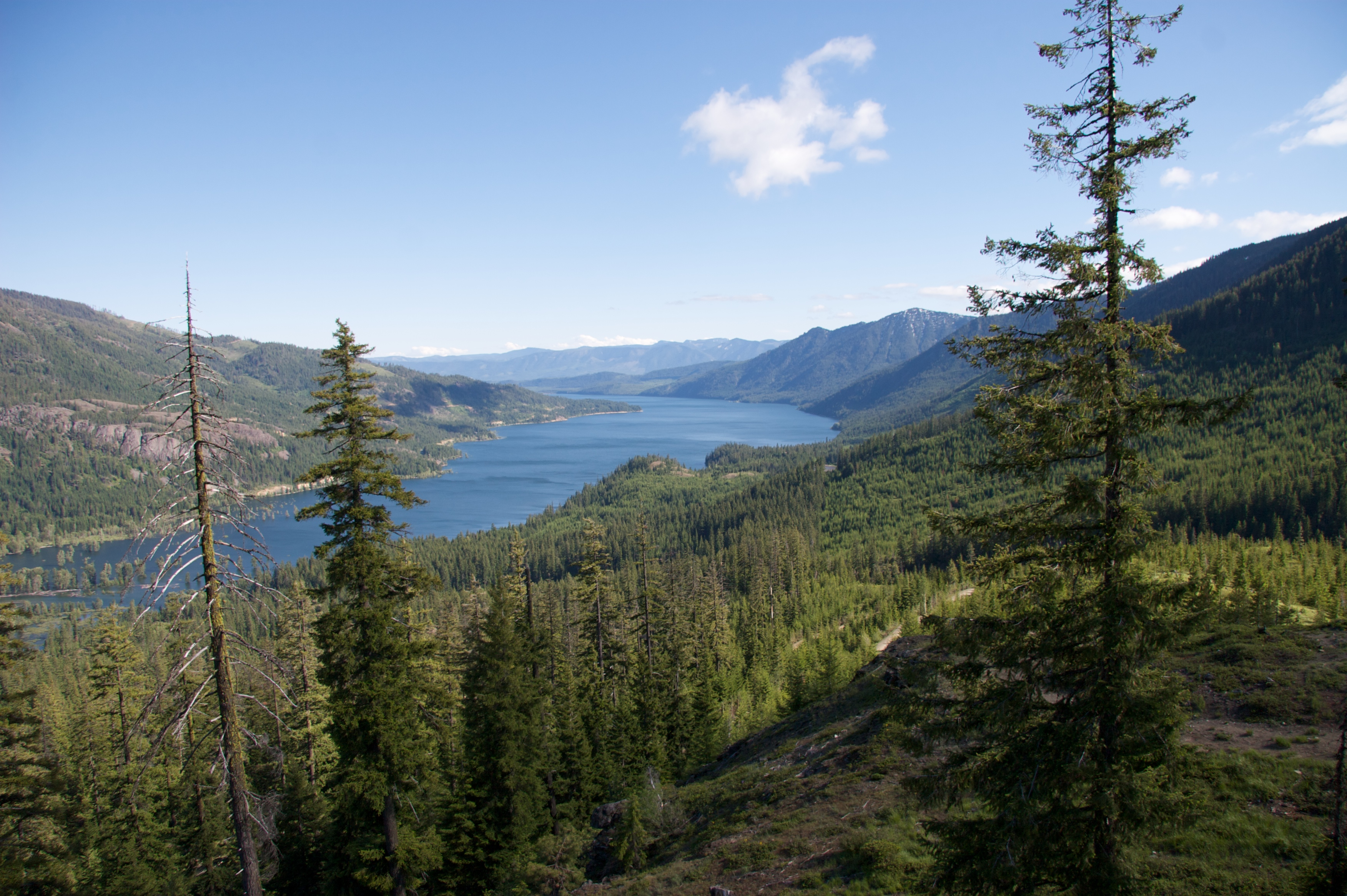
- Cle Elum Lake

- Location within Washington (state) Location within the United States
- Location: Kittitas County, Washington
- Coordinates: 47.2820°N 121.1075°W
- Type: natural lake, reservoir
- Primary inflows: Cle Elum River
- Primary outflows: Cle Elum River
- Catchment area: 260 mi^{2} (670 km^{2})
- Basin countries: United States
- Max. length: 7.4 mi (11.9 km)
- Max. width: 1 mi (1.6 km)
- Water volume: 436,900 acre-feet (538,900,000 m^{3})
- Surface elevation: 2,223 ft (678 m)

Cle Elum Lake is a lake and reservoir along the course of the Cle Elum River, in Washington state, US. At the site of the future city of Cle Elum, Washington, a Northern Pacific Railway station was named Clealum after the Kittitas name Tle-el-Lum (tlielləm), meaning "swift water", referring to the Cle Elum River. The lake was also labeled as Kleattam Lake in maps of the 1850s.

== Location ==
Cle Elum Lake is the easternmost lake of three large lakes (two are north and one is south of Interstate 90) in the Cascade Range. The middle one, Kachess Lake is also north of I-90 while the westernmost, Keechelus Lake is south of I-90.

Cle Elum Lake is part of the Columbia River basin, as the Cle Elum River is a tributary of the Yakima River, which is a tributary to the Columbia River.

== Usage ==
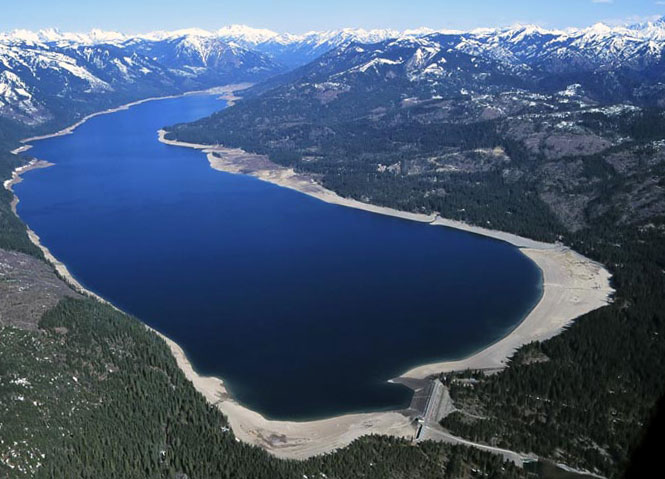
Cle Elum Lake with Cle Elum Dam in the foreground

The lake is used as a storage reservoir for the Yakima Project, an irrigation project run by the United States Bureau of Reclamation. Although a natural lake, Cle Elum Lake's capacity and discharge is controlled by Cle Elum Dam, a 165-foot (50 m) high earthfill structure built in 1933. As a storage reservoir, Cle Elum Lake's active capacity is 436,900 acre feet (539,000,000 m³).

== In Pop Culture ==
- In 1994, the fictional village of Monanash was filmed on Cle Elum Lake for the TV show Northern Exposure.
