= Lemah Mountain =

Mountain in United States of America

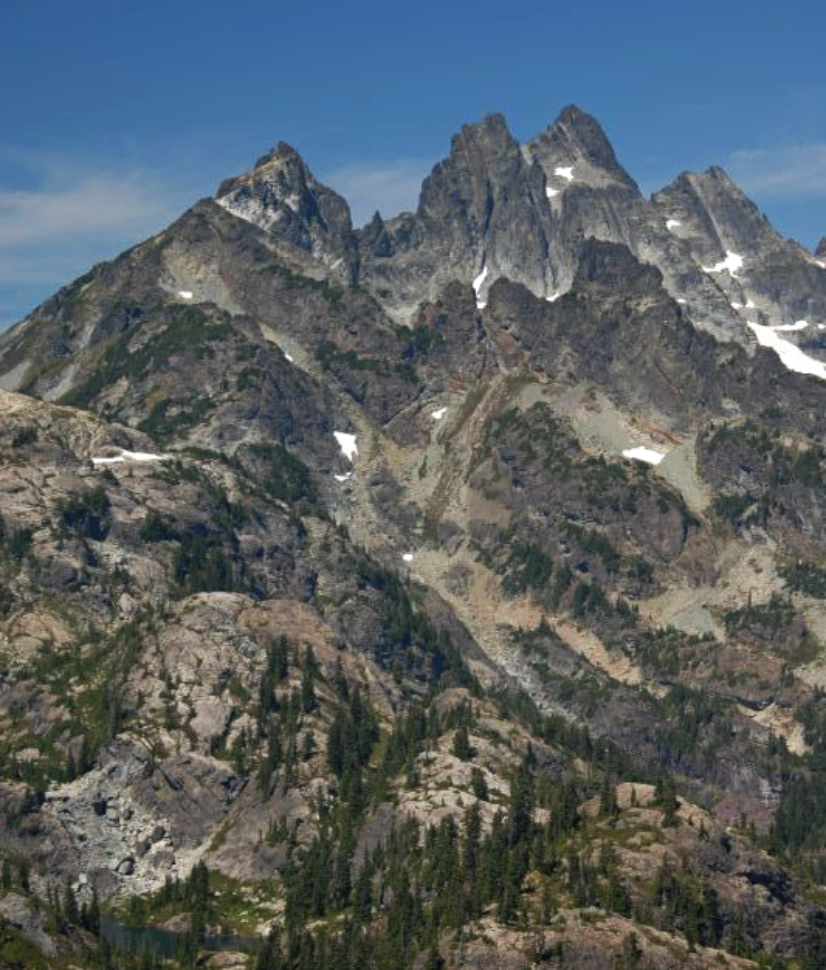
- Lemah Mountain

Highest point
- Elevation: 7,480+ ft (2,280+ m)
- Prominence: 960 ft (290 m)
- Coordinates: 47°29′26″N 121°18′04″W

Geography
- Location: King / Kittitas counties, Washington, U.S.
- Parent range: Cascade Range
- Topo map: USGS Chikamin Peak

Geology
- Volcanic arc: Cascade Volcanic Arc
- Last eruption: N/A

Climbing
- First ascent: 1923 by Wallace Burr and party
- Easiest route: Rock/ice climb

Lemah Mountain is a mountain peak in the Snoqualmie Crest, a part of the North Cascades Mountains, of the US state of Washington, most noted for its five distinct summits. It is approximately 7.7 miles (12.4 km) from Snoqualmie Pass. The name Lemah comes from the Chinook Jargon word Lemah, in turn derived from a French word, le main, meaning "hand". Lemah Mountain formed by rocks crumpled into mountains by the Cascadia subduction zone where the Juan de Fuca and North American Plates meet.

The mountain has five separate summits, the highest of which is more than 7,480 feet (2,280 m) above sea level. Lemah One (6,960'), Lemah Two (7,280'), Main Peak (7,512', also called Lemah Three), Lemah Four (7,200') and Lemah Five (7,040') make up these peaks. Each summit has an individual ascent path. Main Peak, the highest of the five towers, was first ascended in 1923.

The Lemah Glacier rests on the east slope of the mountain, and is mostly divided into three remaining sections. Lemah Creek, a stream named after the mountain, drains this glacier and eventually meets the Cooper River. Burnt Boot Creek drains another flank of Lemah Mountain, and it is a tributary of the Cooper River as well. On the western flank of Lemah is a small lake called Avalanche Lake.

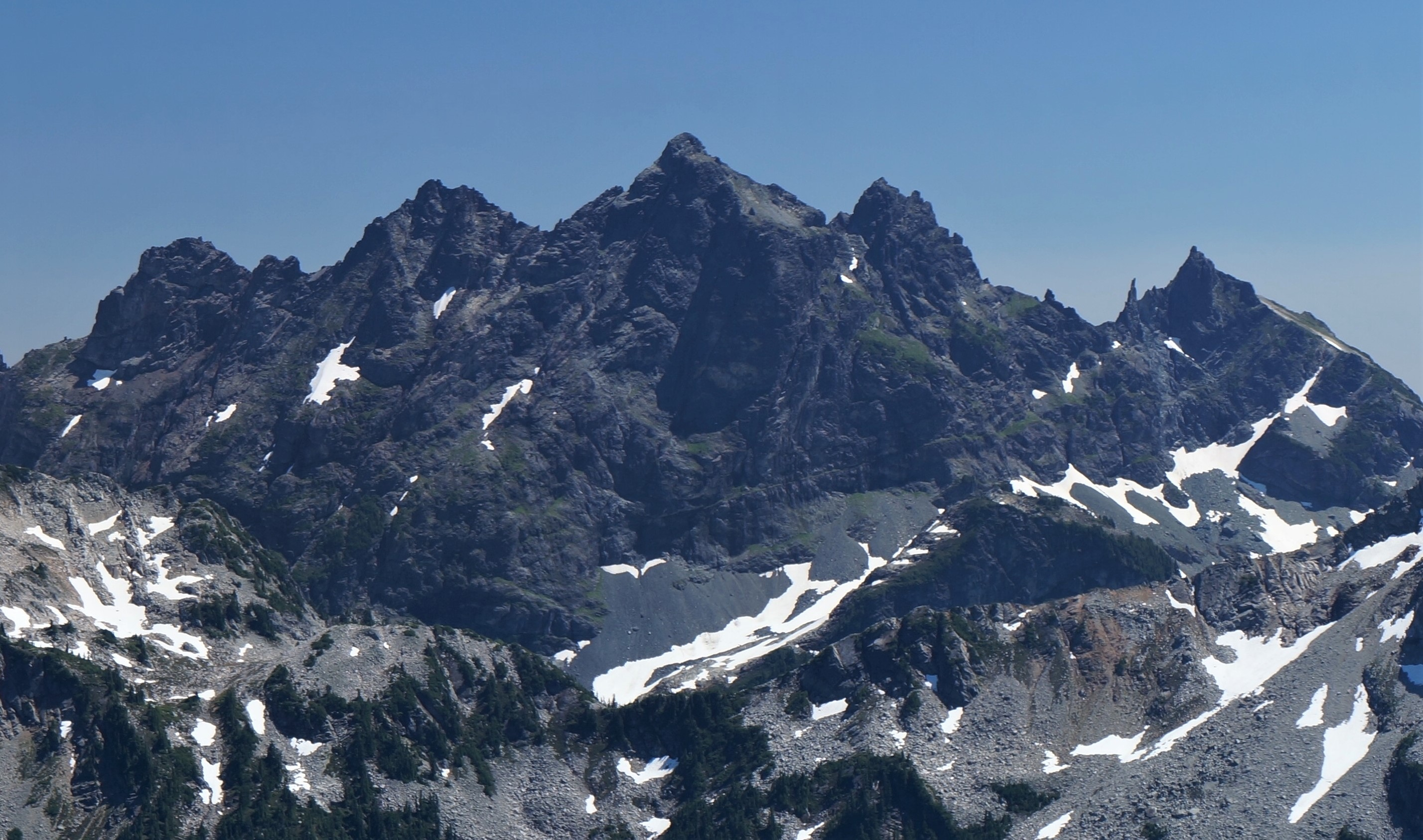
Lemah Mountain seen from Big Snow Mountain

== Ascents ==
- Lemah Mountain's main summit was first climbed by Wallace Burr and party on July 7, 1923.
- Lemah One (6960'), also called Lemah Thumb and Iapia Peak, was first climbed on the 1925 Mountaineer outing.
- On the eastern spur of Lemah Two, there stands two rock towers, the lower of which is the more massive. The upper tower (7000'), also known as Goatshead Spire, was first climbed on August 8, 1982, by Donald Goodman and John Mason.

== Climate ==
Most weather fronts originate in the Pacific Ocean, and travel east toward the Cascade Mountains. As fronts approach, they are forced upward by the peaks of the Cascade Range, causing them to drop their moisture in the form of rain or snowfall onto the Cascades (Orographic lift). As a result, the Cascades experience high precipitation, especially during the winter months in the form of snowfall. During winter months, weather is usually cloudy, but, due to high pressure systems over the Pacific Ocean that intensify during summer months, there is often little or no cloud cover during the summer.

== Geology ==
Lemah Mountain is situated in the Alpine Lakes Wilderness, an area which features some of the most rugged topography in the Cascade Range with craggy peaks and ridges, deep glacial valleys, and granite spires spotted with over 700 mountain lakes. Geological events occurring many years ago created the diverse topography and drastic elevation changes over the Cascade Range leading to various climate differences.

The history of the formation of the Cascade Mountains dates back millions of years ago to the late Eocene Epoch. With the North American Plate overriding the Pacific Plate, episodes of volcanic igneous activity persisted. In addition, small fragments of the oceanic and continental lithosphere called terranes created the North Cascades about 50 million years ago.

During the Pleistocene period dating back over two million years ago, glaciation advancing and retreating repeatedly scoured the landscape leaving deposits of rock debris. The last glacial retreat in the Alpine Lakes area began about 14,000 years ago and was north of the Canada–US border by 10,000 years ago. The U-shaped cross section of the river valleys is a result of that recent glaciation. Uplift and faulting in combination with glaciation have been the dominant processes which have created the tall peaks and deep valleys of the Alpine Lakes Wilderness area.
