= Milwaukee Ski Bowl =

Defunct ski resort in Hyak, Washington, United States

- Location in the United States Location in Washington
- Location: Hyak, Washington
- Nearest city: Seattle
- Coordinates: 47.39°N 121.397°W
- Status: Defunct
- Vertical: 1,140 feet (350 m)
- Top elevation: 3,740 feet (1,140 m)
- Base elevation: 2,600 feet (790 m)
- Lift system: 4 tows and Ski-Boggan (1946)

Milwaukee Ski Bowl was an alpine ski area in the northwest United States in Washington, which operated between 1937 and 1950. It was southeast of Seattle in the Cascade Range at Hyak, on the east side of Snoqualmie Pass.

Executives of the Chicago, Milwaukee, St. Paul and Pacific Railroad ("The Milwaukee Road") built the ski area in the fall of 1937, including a large two-story day lodge and one surface lift near the east portal of the railroad's Snoqualmie Tunnel, just north of Keechelus Lake.

It was originally the "Snoqualmie Ski Bowl" until it closed at the start of World War II. It reopened in 1946 as the "Milwaukee Ski Bowl" to avoid confusion with The Snoqualmie Summit ski area, two miles (3 km) away at the top of the pass. It was a major ski area for its era, comparable to but not as luxurious as Sun Valley, the Union Pacific Railroad's new resort in central Idaho.

In early 1938, there was night skiing, and lift tickets were a dollar a day, or ten cents per individual trip, for the cable surface lift, which vertically climbed 300 feet (90 m). Five runs were in the bowl, named for the railroad's popular trains of the era: Hiawatha, Chippewa, Arrow, Pioneer, and Olympian; additional lifts were added over time.

The area became popular when the Seattle Times newspaper sponsored a free ski school for high school students from Seattle and Tacoma. A round-trip train ticket cost one dollar in 1940, with lift tickets for fifty cents. The 200-foot (60 m) lodge could hold one thousand people and concessions were operated by the Ben Paris complex of Seattle.

A Class-A ski jump was built in 1941 and is said to be the largest in North America. National championship events in ski jumping were held here, including the 1948 Olympic team tryouts, held the preceding spring.

In 1949, the lodge burned down in the early hours of Friday, December 2; the ski area reopened a month later, and operated out of numerous railroad cars on a new spur line for the rest of the season, its last.

The ski area reopened under new ownership in 1959 as Hyak, and continues as Summit East. It has the lowest base elevation of the four Summit at Snoqualmie ski areas, at approximately 2,600 feet (790 m) above sea level.

The railroad later went bankrupt; its former right-of-way in the Cascades is a rail trail, Iron Horse State Park.

== See also ==
- Chicago, Milwaukee, St. Paul and Pacific Railroad
- Snoqualmie Tunnel
- Snoqualmie Pass
- The Summit at Snoqualmie
