= Joy Lucas (ski instructor) =

American ski instructor (1917–2011)

Lucky Valentine Joy Lucas, also known as Joy Lucas (1917–2011) was an American ski instructor and author. She was the first woman certified as a ski instructor in the United States.

== Life ==
Joy Piles was born on February 15, 1917, in Spokane, Washington. Her parents worked for the United States Forest Service at Barlow Pass.

She began skiing in 1938, and married Jim Lucas. From 1940 the couple ran the Deer Valley Ski Lodge together in the Olympic Mountains. Joy Lucas was certified as a professional ski instructor in 1941. After World War II the couple managed Milwaukee Ski Bowl. She taught at Snoqualmie for 27 years, and only retired from ski instruction in 1992 at the age of 75.

She died in Seward Park, the neighborhood she lived in most of her life, in Seattle, Washington on November 25, 2011.

== Books ==
- It Started in the Mountains: A history of Pacific Northwest ski instructors. Professional Ski Instructors of America-NW, 1996. ISBN 978-0965052306
- Ancient Skiers of the Pacific Northwest. 2006.
