= Kittitas Depot =

Kittitas
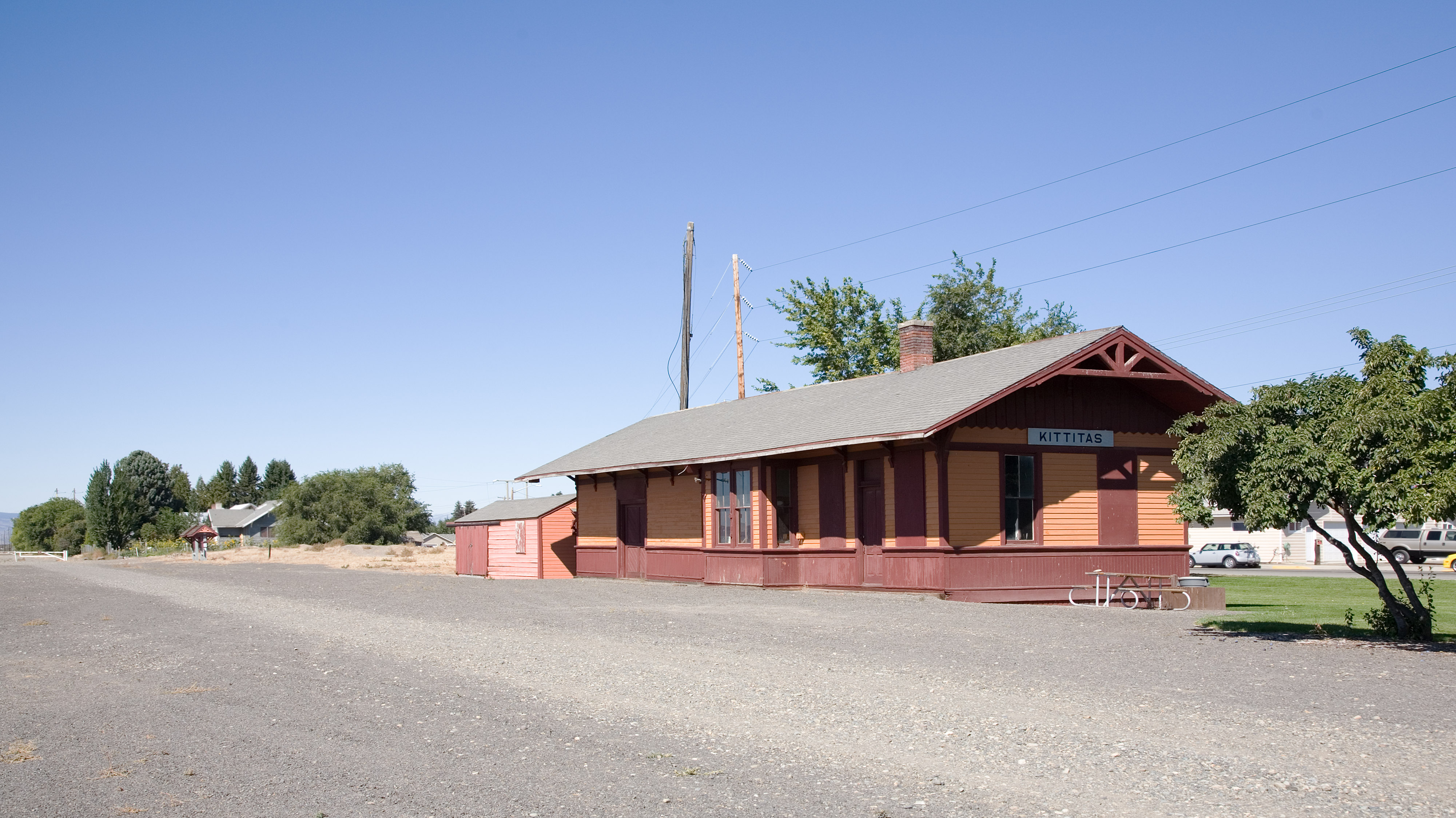
- View of the depot

General information
- Location: 108 Railroad Avenue, Kittitas, Washington 98934
- System: Former Milwaukee Road passenger rail station

History
- Opened: 1909
- Closed: 1980
- Electrified: 1920-1974

Services
Preceding station	Milwaukee Road	Following station
Ellensburg toward Seattle or Tacoma	Main Line	Royalton toward Chicago

Other services
1909-1961 passenger service
- Chicago, Milwaukee, St. Paul & Pacific Railroad--Kittitas Depot
- U.S. National Register of Historic Places
- Location within Washington (state)
- Location: Jct. of Railroad Ave. and Main St. Kittitas, Washington
- Coordinates: 46°58′55″N 120°25′05″W
- Built: 1909
- Architect: Chicago, Milwaukee and Puget Sound Railway
- Architectural style: CM&PS Lombard Type Depot
- MPS: Milwaukee Road MPS
- NRHP reference No.: 92001582
- Added to NRHP: November 19, 1992
Location

The Chicago, Milwaukee, St. Paul & Pacific Railroad-Kittitas Depot is a railroad station in Kittitas, Washington, United States, that was built in 1909 by the Chicago, Milwaukee and Puget Sound Railway (the "Milwaukee Road") as part of the railroad's Pacific Extension.

The depot is a rectangular, single-story, wood-frame building. It was built to serve the local community by shipping agricultural products. A small rail yard served the potato packing houses. In 1919, after the railroad electrified, an electric substation and operators' houses were built adjacent to the depot. In 1974, the substation was razed, and the operators' houses were sold to private individuals. After the railroad abandoned the Pacific Extension in 1980, the depot was taken over by the State of Washington and is now part of the Iron Horse State Park, a rails-to-trails initiative.

The depot was listed in the National Register because of its association with the Milwaukee Road and the development of railroads in Washington.
