= Rockdale =

Rockdale is the name of several places:

== Australia ==
- Rockdale, New South Wales, Australia
- City of Rockdale, the former local government area in New South Wales, Australia

== United Kingdom ==
- Rockdale, a town land in County Tyrone, Northern Ireland

== United States ==
- Rockdale County, Georgia
- Rockdale, Illinois, a village
- Rockdale, Indiana, an unincorporated community
- Rockdale, Kentucky, an unincorporated community
- Rockdale (Fallston, Maryland), a home on the National Register of Historic Places
- Rockdale, New York, a hamlet
- Rockdale, Pennsylvania, an unincorporated community
- Rockdale Township, Pennsylvania, a township
- Rockdale, Texas, a city
- Rockdale, Washington, a ghost town
- Rockdale, Wisconsin, a village
