= Keechelus Lake =

- Location within Washington (state) Location within the United States
- Location: Kittitas County, Washington, U.S.
- Coordinates: 47.35°N 121.37°W
- Type: natural lake, reservoir
- Primary outflows: Yakima River
- Catchment area: 54.3 sq mi (141 km^{2})
- Basin countries: United States
- Max. length: 4.2 miles (6.8 km)
- Max. width: 1 mile (1.6 km)
- Water volume: 157,800 acre-feet (194,600,000 m^{3})
- Surface elevation: 2,517 feet (767 m)

Keechelus Lake (/ˈkɛtʃələs/) is a lake and reservoir in the northwest United States, near Hyak in Kittitas County, Washington. Approximately fifty miles (80 km) southeast of Seattle and a few miles southeast of Snoqualmie Pass, it is the source of the Yakima River.

Keechelus Lake is the westernmost of three large lakes near Interstate 90 and north of the Yakima River in the Cascade Range; the other two are Kachess Lake in the middle and Cle Elum Lake to the east. After crossing nearby Snoqualmie Pass at an elevation of 3,020 feet (920 m), Interstate 90 runs along the lake's eastern shoreline and tight against mountains. Its westbound lanes included a snowshed midway (47.355°N 121.3658°W, milepost 57.7); built in 1950 for U.S. Route 10, it was removed in April 2014.

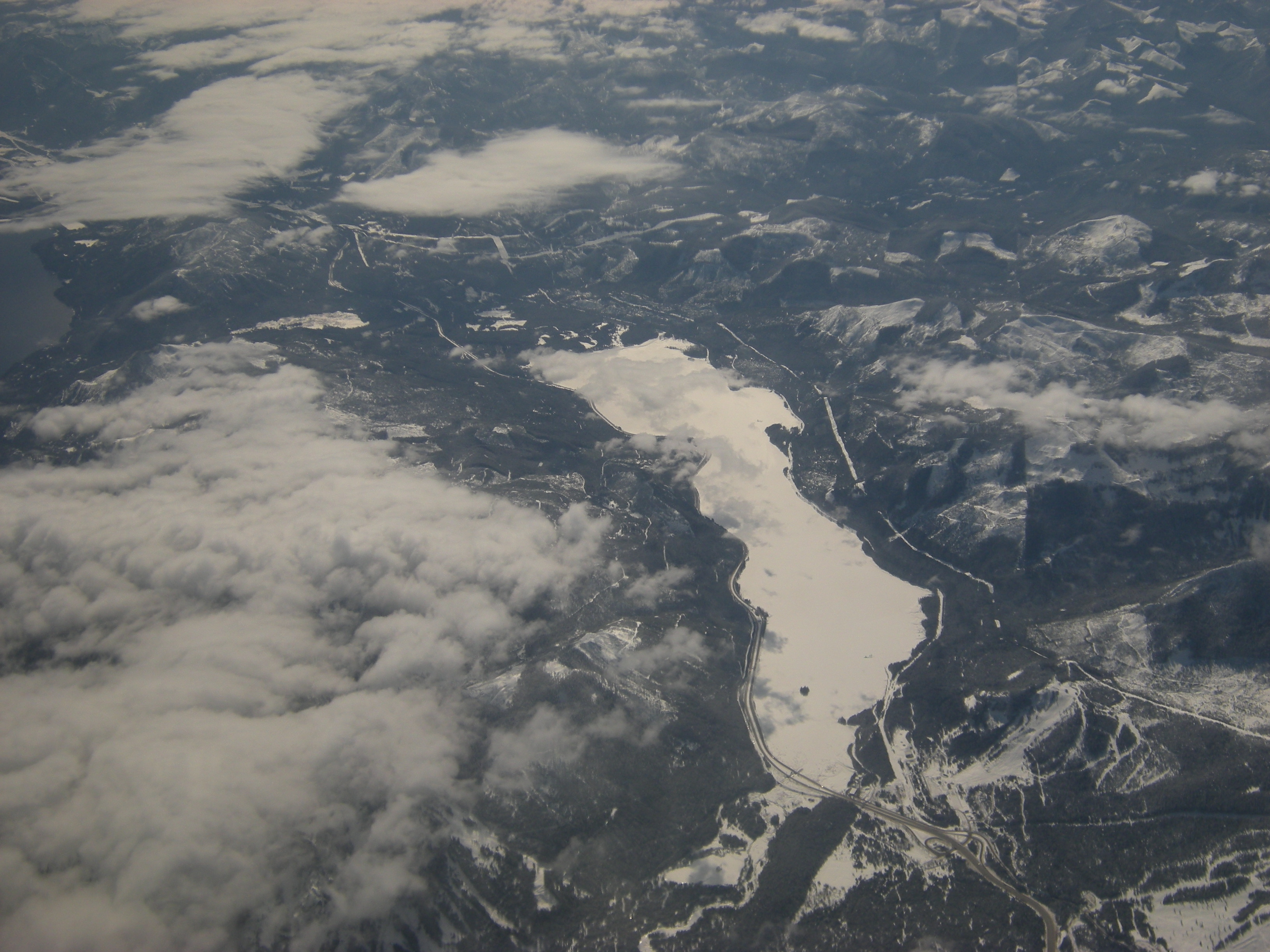
Aerial view of Keechelus Lake looking roughly south

Keechelus Lake is part of the Columbia River basin, being the source of the Yakima River, which is a tributary to the Columbia River.

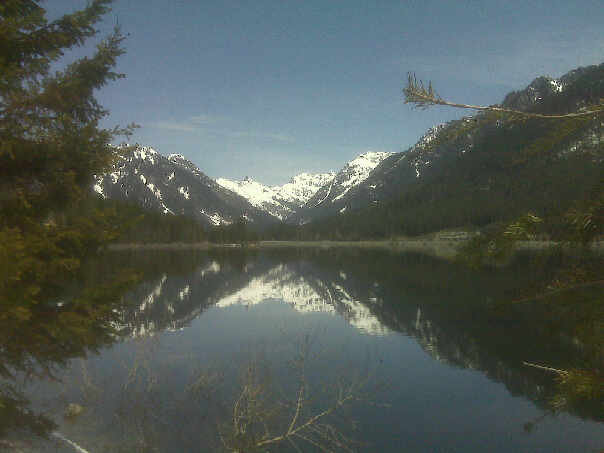
Keechelus Lake looking toward Hyak and Alpental

The lake is used as a storage reservoir for the Yakima Project, an irrigation project run by the United States Bureau of Reclamation. Although a natural lake, Keechelus Lake's capacity and discharge is controlled by Keechelus Dam, a 128-foot (39 m) high earthfill structure built in 1917. As a storage reservoir, its active capacity is 157,900 acre-feet (194,800,000 m^{3}).

The name Keechelus comes from a Native American term meaning "few fish", in contrast to Kachess Lake, whose name means "more fish".

The Chicago, Milwaukee, St. Paul and Pacific Railroad ("Milwaukee Road") formerly ran along the west shore of the lake and crossed the Cascades through the 2¼-mile (3.6 km) Snoqualmie Tunnel, with its east portal at Hyak. Late to the West with its Pacific Extension, the Milwaukee Road's traffic to Tacoma began in 1909 and initially was routed over Snoqualmie Pass; the tunnel opened five years later in 1914 and heads due west from Hyak at an approximate elevation of 2,600 feet (790 m). Close to the east portal near the lake's northwest shore was the Milwaukee Ski Bowl, built in 1937 and operated by the railroad until 1950.

The Milwaukee Road went through several bankruptcies; its rails were abandoned in 1980 and the right-of-way is now a rail trail, Iron Horse State Park, which includes the tunnel.

About two miles (3 km) south of Keechelus Lake, the Northern Pacific Railway crossed the Cascades at Stampede Pass, and later through the associated tunnel, which opened 138 years ago in 1888. This route is still in use by NP's successor, BNSF Railway. It also had a ski area, the Martin Ski Dome.

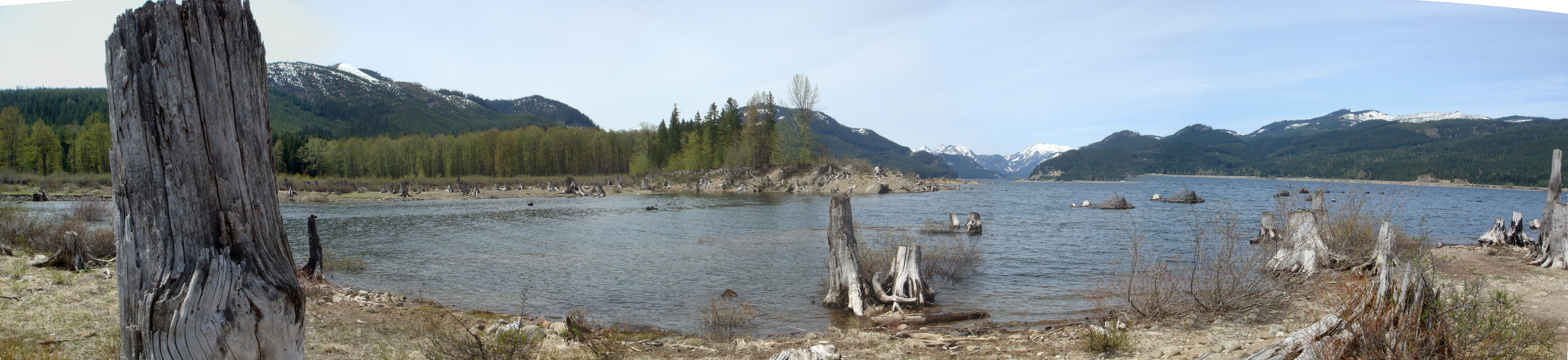
Keechelus Lake panorama

== Climate ==
Climate data for LAKE KEECHELUS, WA
| Month | Jan | Feb | Mar | Apr | May | Jun | Jul | Aug | Sep | Oct | Nov | Dec | Year |
|---|---|---|---|---|---|---|---|---|---|---|---|---|---|
| Record high °F (°C) | 55 (13) | 63 (17) | 68 (20) | 88 (31) | 90 (32) | 107 (42) | 102 (39) | 97 (36) | 92 (33) | 85 (29) | 63 (17) | 59 (15) | 107 (42) |
| Mean daily maximum °F (°C) | 33 (1) | 37 (3) | 43 (6) | 49 (9) | 57 (14) | 64 (18) | 72 (22) | 73 (23) | 67 (19) | 54 (12) | 41 (5) | 33 (1) | 52 (11) |
| Mean daily minimum °F (°C) | 22 (−6) | 23 (−5) | 26 (−3) | 30 (−1) | 36 (2) | 43 (6) | 48 (9) | 47 (8) | 41 (5) | 34 (1) | 28 (−2) | 23 (−5) | 33 (1) |
| Record low °F (°C) | −28 (−33) | −27 (−33) | −11 (−24) | 4 (−16) | 16 (−9) | 27 (−3) | 30 (−1) | 30 (−1) | 23 (−5) | 15 (−9) | −2 (−19) | −18 (−28) | −28 (−33) |
| Average precipitation inches (mm) | 11.9 (300) | 7.9 (200) | 6.4 (160) | 4.1 (100) | 2.3 (58) | 1.9 (48) | 0.8 (20) | 1.3 (33) | 2.8 (71) | 6.2 (160) | 10.0 (250) | 12.0 (300) | 67.6 (1,700) |
| Average snowfall inches (cm) | 65 (170) | 42 (110) | 33 (84) | 9 (23) | 0.5 (1.3) | 0 (0) | 0 (0) | 0 (0) | 0 (0) | 1.5 (3.8) | 22 (56) | 49 (120) | 222 (568.1) |
Source: NOAA

== See also ==
- List of dams in the Columbia River watershed
- The Summit at Snoqualmie
- Hyak, Washington
- Milwaukee Ski Bowl
- Martin, Washington
- Martin Ski Dome
- Baker Lake, on a cirque of Keechelus Ridge
