= Indian Powerplus =

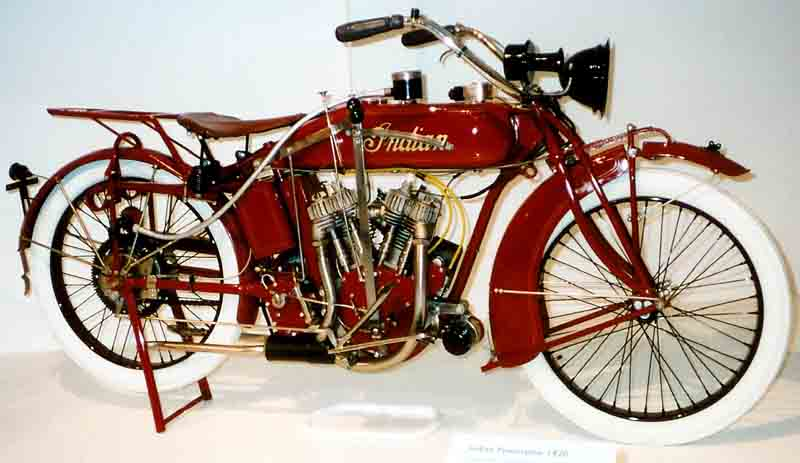
- 1920 Indian Powerplus with Cradle Spring Frame
- Manufacturer: Hendee Manufacturing Company
- Also called: Indian Standard (1923-1924)
- Production: 1916-1924
- Assembly: Springfield, MA, USA
- Predecessor: 1913-1916 Indian V-Twin
- Successor: Indian Chief
- Engine: Four-stroke 42° flathead V-twin engine (see engine infobox below)
- Transmission: 3-speed gearbox, hand shifter, hand and foot clutch controls
- Suspension: Front: Trailing-link fork with leaf spring Rear: either rigid (as standard) or by swingarm linked by struts to leaf springs (with optional Cradle Spring Frame)
- Brakes: Front: none Rear: internal expanding drum, external band brake
- Weight: 430 lb (200 kg) (wet)
- Fuel capacity: 2.5 US gal (9.5 L)
- Related: 1913-1916 Indian V-Twin (frames, transmission, clutch, tanks, fenders)

Indian Powerplus engine
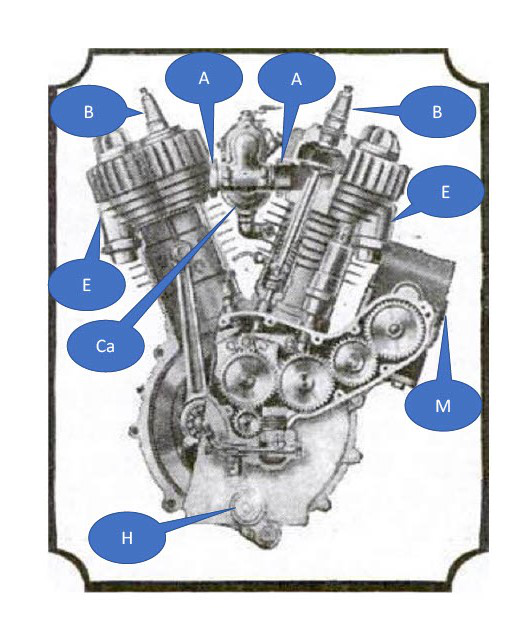

Overview
- Manufacturer: Hendee Manufacturing Company
- Production: 61 cu. in.: 1916-1924; 72 cu. in.: (1920-1922)

Layout
- Configuration: 42° V-twin
- Displacement: 61 cu in (1,000 cc); 72.59 cu in (1,189.5 cc)
- Cylinder bore: 61 cu. in.: 3 1/8 in (79 mm); 72 cu. in.: 3 1/4 in (83 mm)
- Piston stroke: 61 cu. in.: 3 31/32 in (101 mm); 72 cu. in.: 4 3/8 in (110 mm)
- Valvetrain: flathead

Combustion
- Fuel type: petrol
- Cooling system: air cooled

Chronology
- Predecessor: Indian F-head V-Twin
- Successor: Indian Chief engine

The Indian Powerplus is a motorcycle that was built from 1916 to 1924 by the Hendee Manufacturing Company. Designed by Charles Gustafson, the Powerplus's engine was Indian's first flathead.

== Origin ==
Charles Gustafson left Reading Standard in 1909 and joined Indian as Oscar Hedstrom's assistant. Gustafson had designed side valve "flathead" engines for Reading Standard, which had been the first motorcycle manufacturer in the United States to use a flathead engine in a production motorcycle. When Hedstrom left Indian in 1913, Gustafson became Indian's chief engineer.

In late 1915, Indian introduced Gustafson's replacement for Hedstrom's 61-cubic-inch (1,000 cc) V-twin engine. The new engine used side valves instead of the inlet-over-exhaust (IOE) valve layout used in Hedstrom's designs. The flathead engine was quieter and less expensive to manufacture than the earlier IOE engine and needed less maintenance. It was named "Powerplus" because its output of approximately 16 horsepower (12 kW) was noticeably greater than that of the earlier engine.

The new engine was installed in the existing frames for Indian V-twin motorcycles, and used existing drivetrain components, tanks, handlebars, and other components. The drive train included a clutch, a kickstarter, and a three-speed gearbox.

The standard frame for the Powerplus had a conventional rigid rear wheel mounting, but the Powerplus was also available with Indian's Cradle Spring Frame. Introduced in 1913, the Cradle Spring Frame had a rear swingarm linked to trailing leaf springs.

== Controls ==
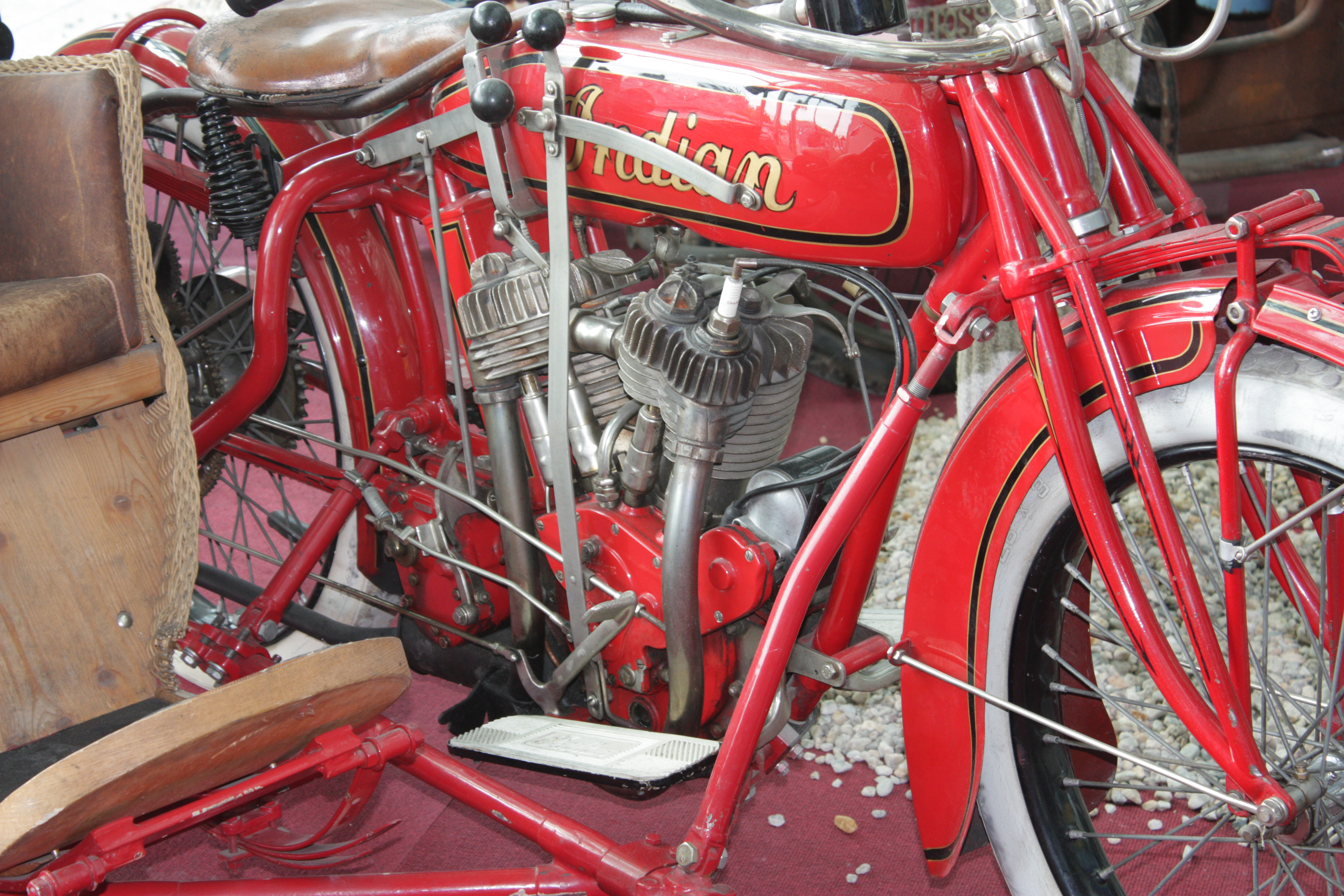
Detail shot of 1918 Indian Powerplus, showing engine, with removable caps for valve removal, hand control levers for clutch, gearbox, and exhaust valve lifter, and pedal for rear drum brake

The Powerplus had twist grips on both handles; the throttle was controlled by the left twist grip while the right twist grip advanced or retarded the spark. Three controls were on the right side of the gas tank, a vertically operated shifter, an exhaust valve lifter, and a hand clutch lever. The clutch lever was linked to the clutch pedal positioned on the left side of the bike.

== Promotion and development ==
Between 24 and 28 August 1915, Erwin "Cannonball" Baker rode an early Indian Powerplus from Vancouver to Tijuana in 3 days, 9 hours and 15 minutes, establishing a new "Three Flags" record.

The Powerplus engine was revised in 1917 with the barrels and pistons lengthened by a quarter of an inch and the piston wrist pin relocated below the piston center. This was done to reduce the occurrence of piston slap. The valve caps in the cylinder head were finned from 1917 until the end of production.

In 1917, Walter Steinhart became the first motorcyclist to reach the summit of Snoqualmie Pass. At least several miles of the journey were undertaken under conditions of heavy snow. The Indian Powerplus motorcycle Steinhart rode was able to make better progress than a man leading a horse that he passed. On January 1, 1917 Steinhart finished first among ten riders in a 180-mile course twice around Lake Washington in a time of 3 hours, 20 minutes. On August 20 of that year, Steinhart competed in the Seattle MC Contest Seattle-North Yakima-Goldendale-White-Salmon-Portland enduro and finished third behind G. C. Austin and Ray Smith. His Indian lost ground between North Yakima and Goldendale.

A larger engine, with a displacement of approximately 72 cubic inches (1,180 cc), became available in 1920.

== End of production ==
Production of the larger Powerplus engine ended in 1922, the year in which production of the Powerplus's eventual successor, the Chief, began production. The Powerplus was renamed the "Standard" in 1922, reflecting the fact that it was not as powerful as the Chief.

The Standard was discontinued in 1923, and the Cradle Spring Frame was discontinued with it. Indian would not offer rear suspension on a production motorcycle again until 1940, when the Chief and the Four would be given plunger suspension.
