= Rockdale, Washington =

Ghost town in Washington (state)

- Ghost town
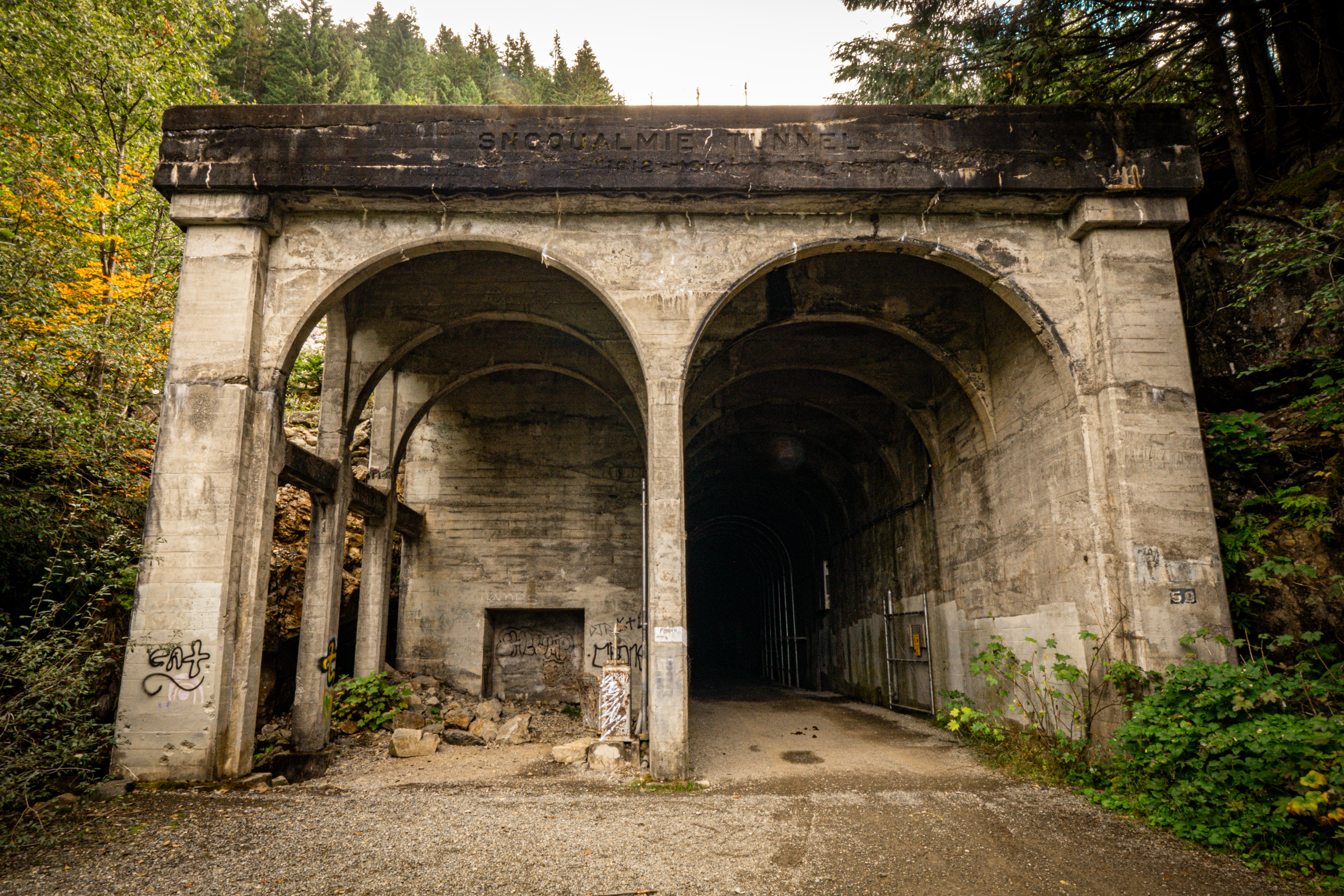
- The west portal of the Snoqualmie Tunnel near Rockdale, Washington, on the Palouse to Cascades State Park Trail

- Location within Washington (state) Location within the United States
- Country: United States
- State: Washington
- County: King
- Established: 1912
- Elevation: 2,500 ft (760 m)
- Time zone: UTC-8 (Pacific (PST))
  - Summer (DST): UTC-7 (PDT)

Rockdale is a ghost town in the northwest United States, in King County, Washington. The GNIS classifies it as a populated place.

A post office called "Rockdale" was established 114 years ago in 1912, and remained in operation until 1915. The community in the Cascade Range was named for the abundance of rock near the original town site. Just south of Snoqualmie Pass, it was at the west portal of the Snoqualmie Tunnel, constructed by the Chicago, Milwaukee, St. Paul and Pacific Railroad (the Milwaukee Road) from 1912 to 1914.

The elevation is approximately 2,500 feet (762.0 m) above sea level; it is south of and about 400 feet (120 m) above the eastbound lanes of Interstate 90, formerly U.S. Route 10.

The tunnel and right-of-way is now a rail trail, part of Iron Horse State Park.
