= Snoqualmie Tunnel =

Tunnel in Washington, United States

- East portal at Hyak in 2006

Overview
- Location: Hyak, Washington
- Coordinates: 47.3947°N 121.3963°W
- Crosses: Cascade Range, near Snoqualmie Pass

Operation
- Work began: 1912
- Opened: 1914, 112 years ago
- Operator: Milwaukee Road
- Character: Rail until 1980, now non-motorized trail

Technical
- Length: 2.2526 miles (3.625 km)
- No. of tracks: Single
- Track gauge: Standard
- Electrified: Yes
- Max elevation: 2,600 feet (790 m)

The Snoqualmie Tunnel is a former railroad tunnel near Snoqualmie Pass in the U.S. state of Washington, located east of Seattle. The tunnel crosses the Cascade Range about three miles (5 km) south of the pass, which is used by Interstate 90, on the border between King County and Kittitas County. It is 11,894 feet (2.253 mi; 3.625 km) long and is at an approximate elevation of 2,600 feet (790 m) above sea level, just north of Keechelus Lake. Its east portal is at Hyak.

The tunnel was originally constructed for the Chicago, Milwaukee, St. Paul and Pacific Railroad in the early 1910s and was abandoned in 1980. It now serves as part of a rail trail in Iron Horse State Park, known officially as the Palouse to Cascades State Park Trail. The trail was formerly known as the John Wayne Pioneer Trail and commonly called the Iron Horse Trail. A major renovation to the walls, ceiling, and path were completed in July 2011 after a two-year closure.

== History ==
The tunnel was constructed from 1912 to 1914 by the Chicago, Milwaukee, St. Paul and Pacific Railroad ("The Milwaukee Road") as part of its line from Chicago to Seattle, completed in 1909. It replaced a temporary surface line over Snoqualmie Pass at 3,020 feet (920 m); this grade from east of Hyak to Rockdale later became U.S. Route 10. The tunnel is aligned east–west and electrification in 1917 eliminated smoke dissipation issues.

In 1980, the Milwaukee Road received approval from the Interstate Commerce Commission to abandon its lines west of eastern Montana. On March 15, 1980, the final Milwaukee Road train passed through the tunnel. Track was sold to Burlington Northern in 1982 and track removed and abandoned by 1987. Later, the State of Washington acquired the right-of-way for recreational use.

Today the tunnel is part of the Iron Horse State Park rails-to-trails project. It is usually closed between November 1 through early May due to ice formations inside the tunnel. On July 5, 2011, the tunnel re-opened after 11 months of renovations. The $700,000 renovation added a four-inch (10 cm) layer of concrete to the walls and ceiling, a reinforced structure, and a new and improved walking surface of crushed rock.

== Gallery ==
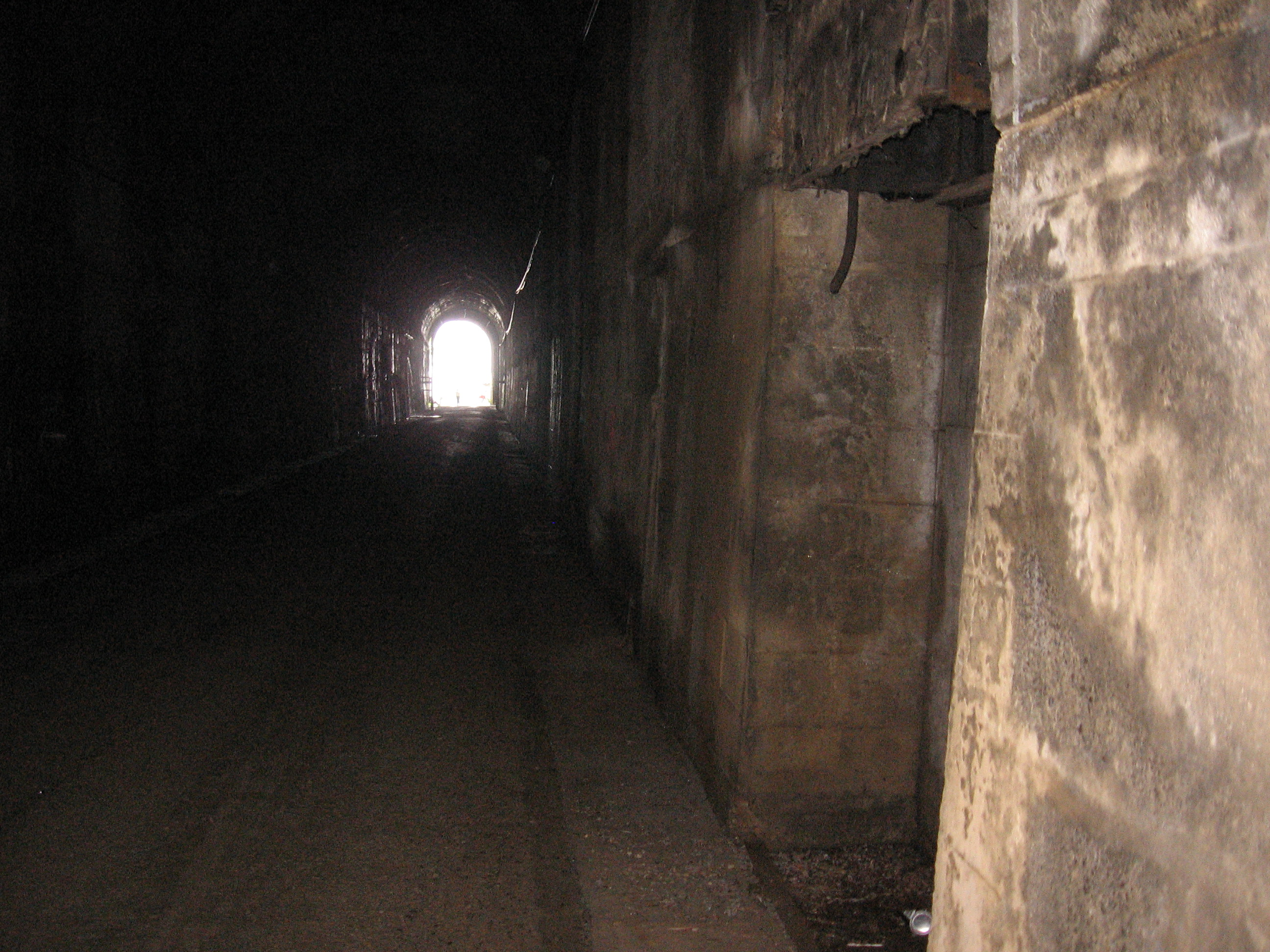
About 200 yards from exiting the west side of the Snoqualmie Tunnel

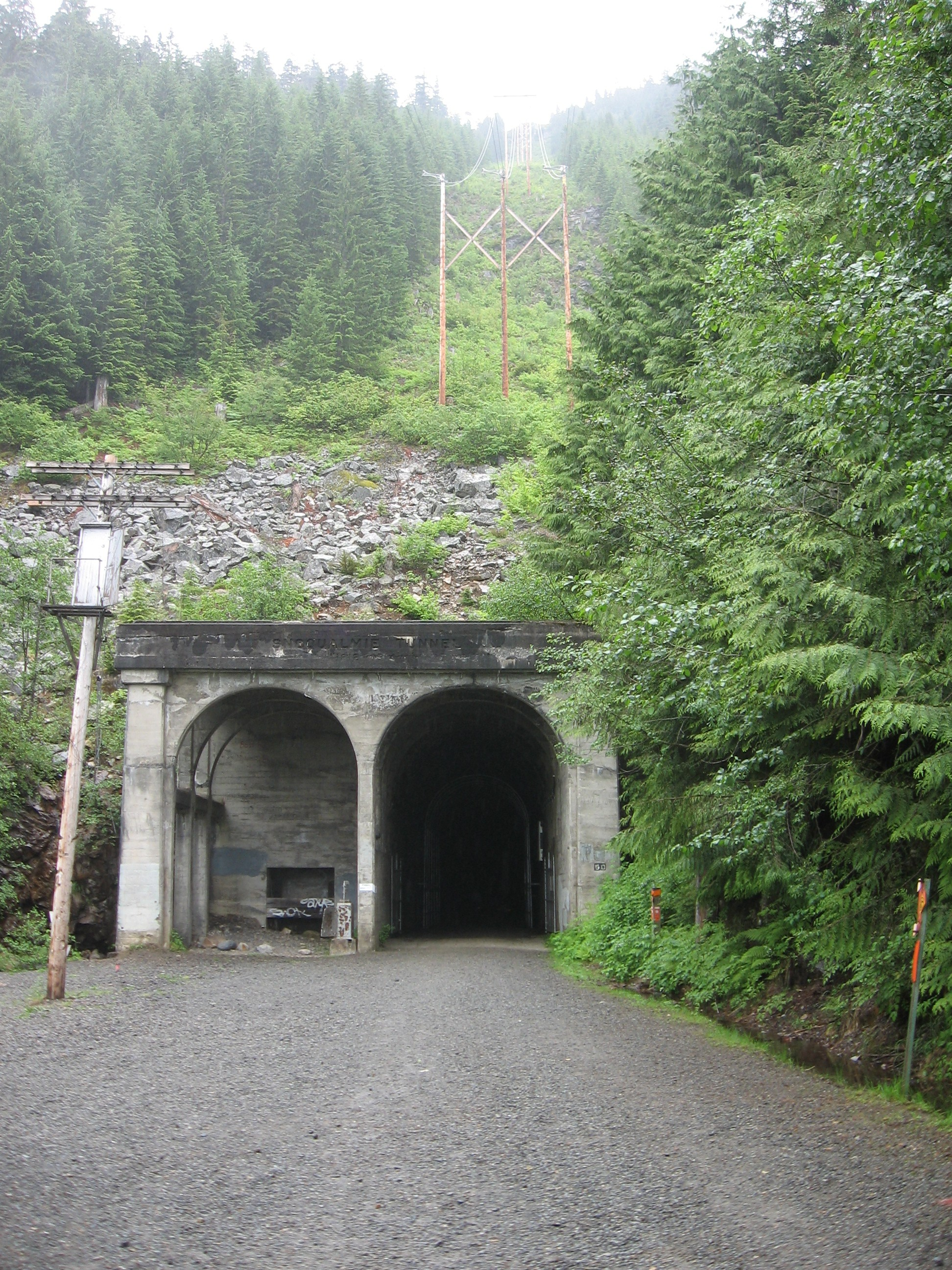
The west entrance to the Snoqualmie Tunnel

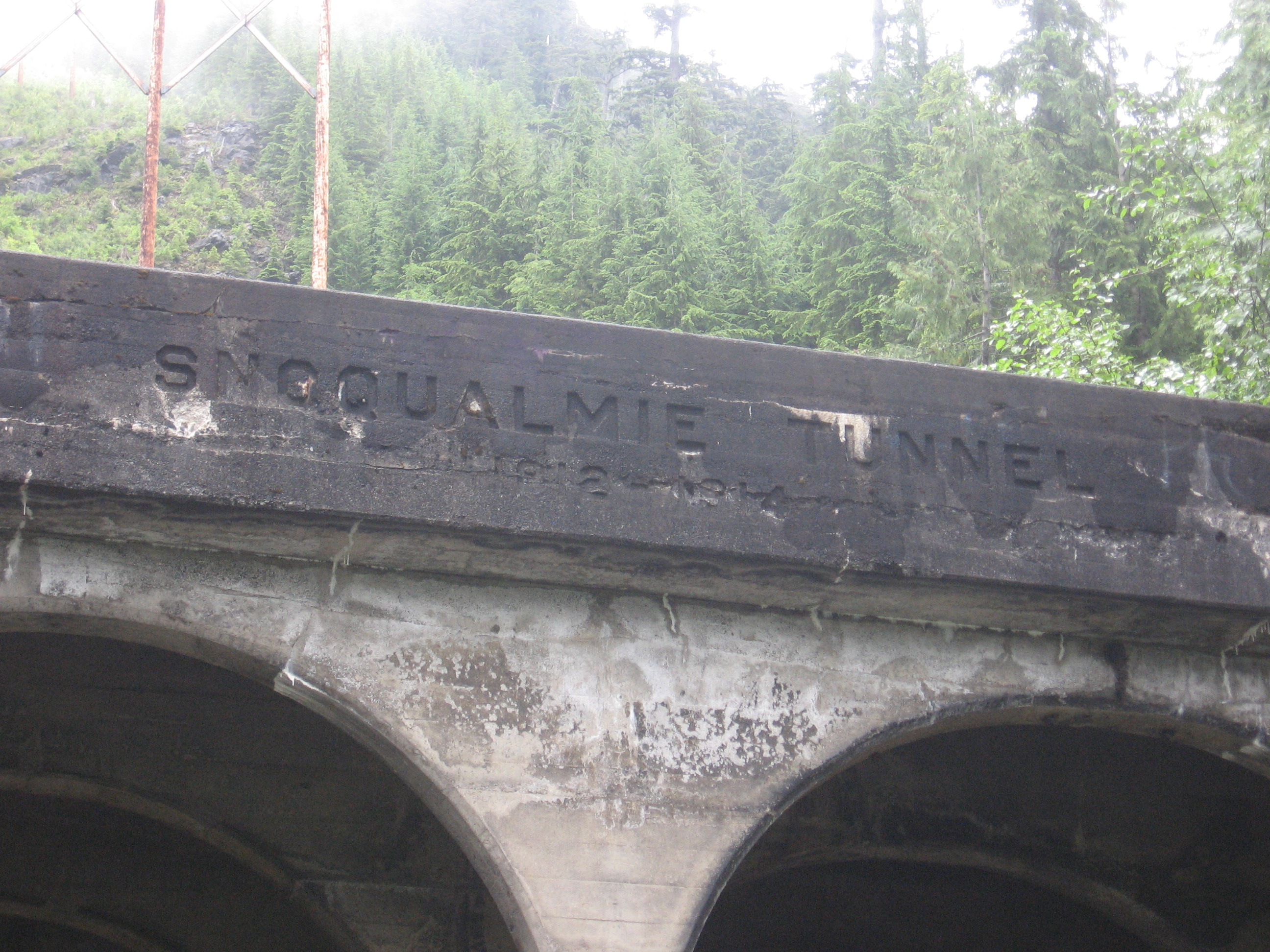
Snoqualmie Tunnel 1912–1914.

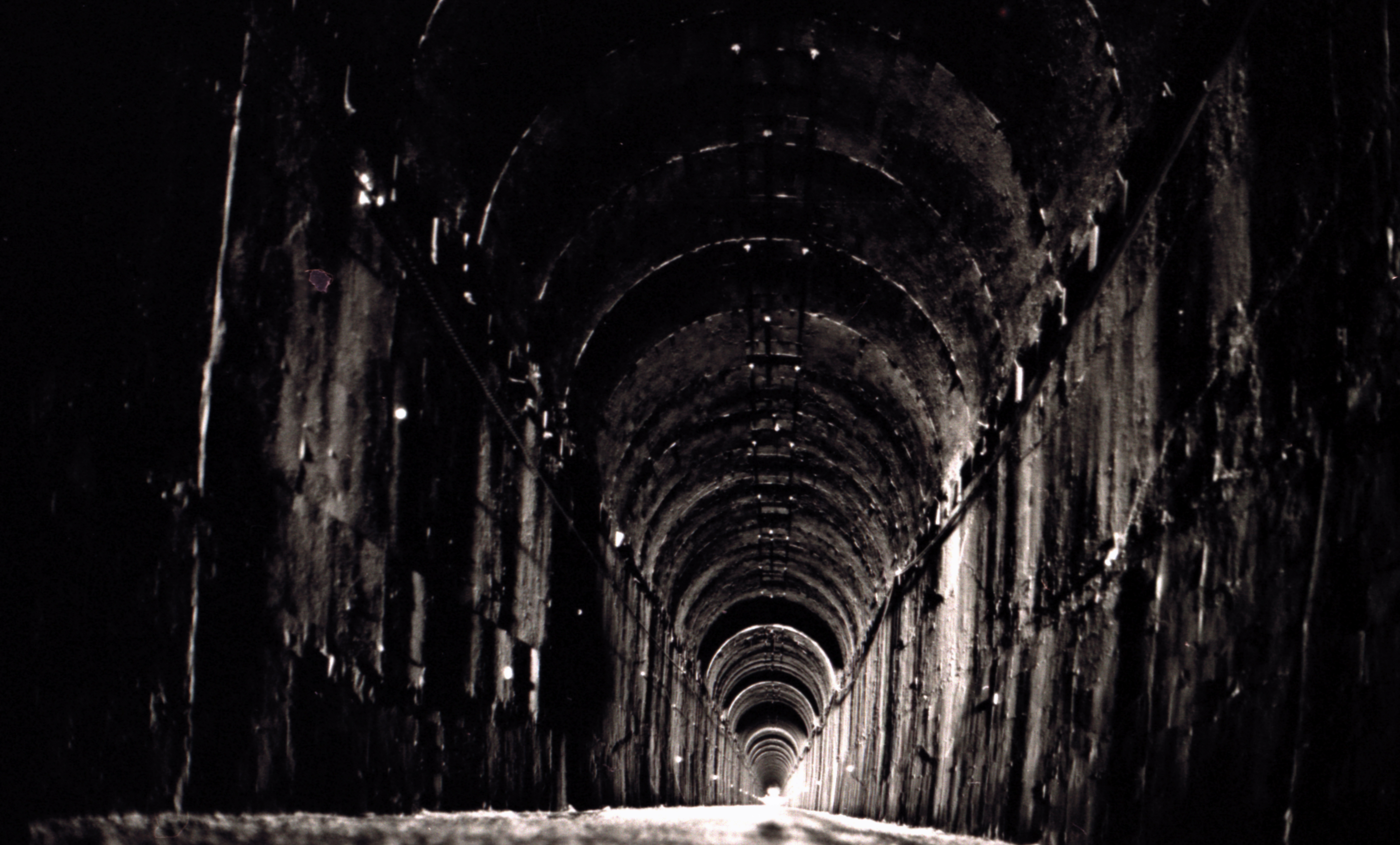
Inside the tunnel 2008.

== See also ==
- Cascade Tunnel − Great Northern tunnel traversing Stevens Pass
- Stampede Tunnel − Northern Pacific tunnel traversing Stampede Pass
- St. Paul Pass Tunnel − (Idaho-Montana)
- List of long tunnels by type#Bicycle and pedestrian
