= Kittitas, Washington =

- City
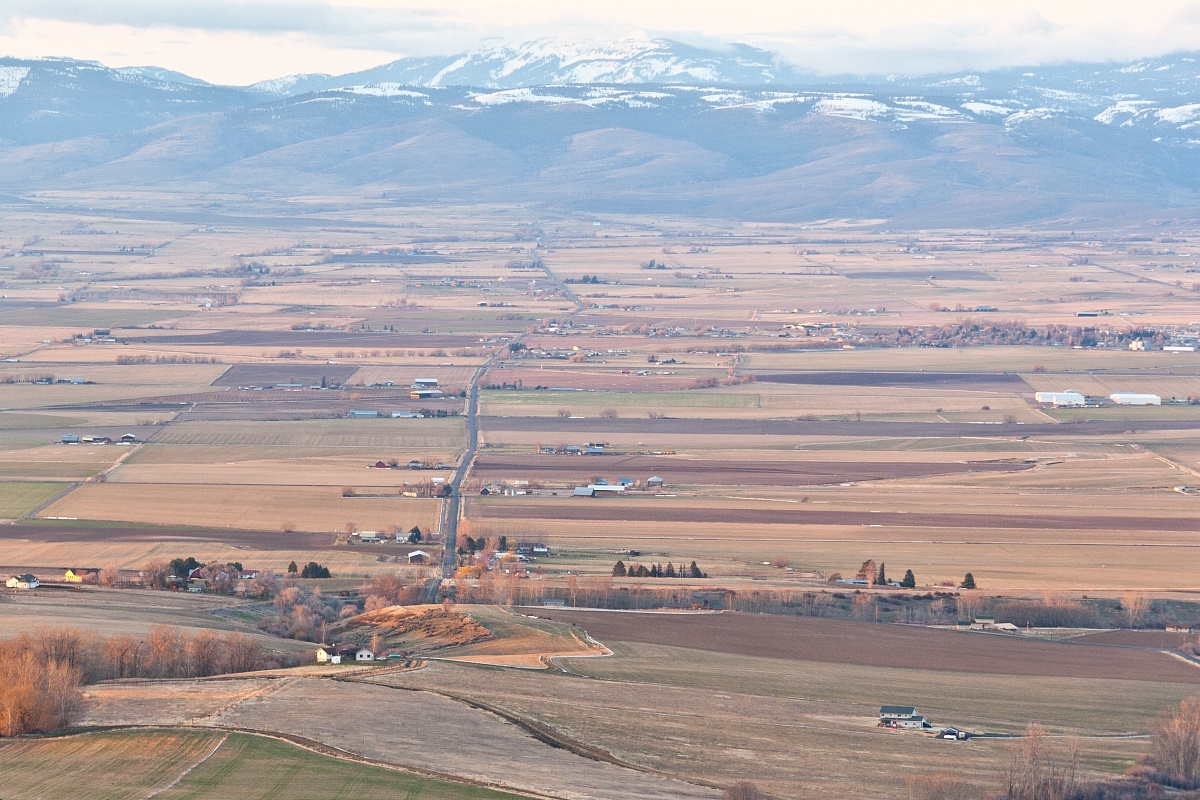
- Kittitas, Washington viewed from U.S. Highway 97

- Location of Kittitas, Washington
- Coordinates: 46°59′01″N 120°25′08″W
- Country: United States
- State: Washington
- County: Kittitas

Government
  - Type: Mayor–council
  - Mayor: Richard Hink

Area
  - Total: 0.78 sq mi (2.02 km^{2})
  - Land: 0.78 sq mi (2.02 km^{2})
  - Water: 0 sq mi (0.00 km^{2})
- Elevation: 1,650 ft (500 m)

Population (2020)
  - Total: 1,438
  - Density: 1,840/sq mi (712/km^{2})
- Time zone: UTC-8 (Pacific (PST))
  - Summer (DST): UTC-7 (PDT)
- ZIP Code: 98934
- Area code: 509
- FIPS code: 53-36045
- GNIS feature ID: 2411553
- Website: www.cityofkittitas.com

Kittitas (/ˈkɪtɪtæs/) is a city in Kittitas County, Washington, United States. The population was 1,438 at the 2020 census. It is also a part of the Ellensburg micropolitan area.

There are numerous interpretations of the name, which is from the language of the Kittitas American Indian Sahaptin language. According to toponymist William Bright, the name "Kittitas" comes from the Sahaptin placename [k'ɨtɨtáš], referring to a gravel bank in the Yakima River. According to Jennifer Cochran, it "has been said to mean everything from 'white chalk' to 'shale rock' to 'shoal people' to 'land of beauty', and that most anthropologists and historians concede that each interpretation has some validity depending upon the particular dialect spoken."

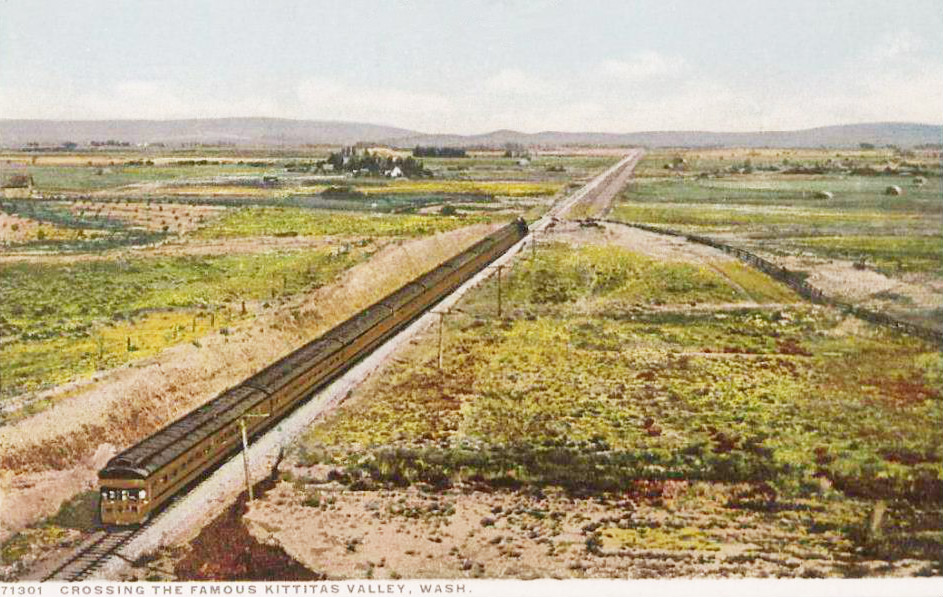
Postcard photo of a Milwaukee Road train in the Kittitas valley circa 1915. The train is either The Olympian or The Columbian.

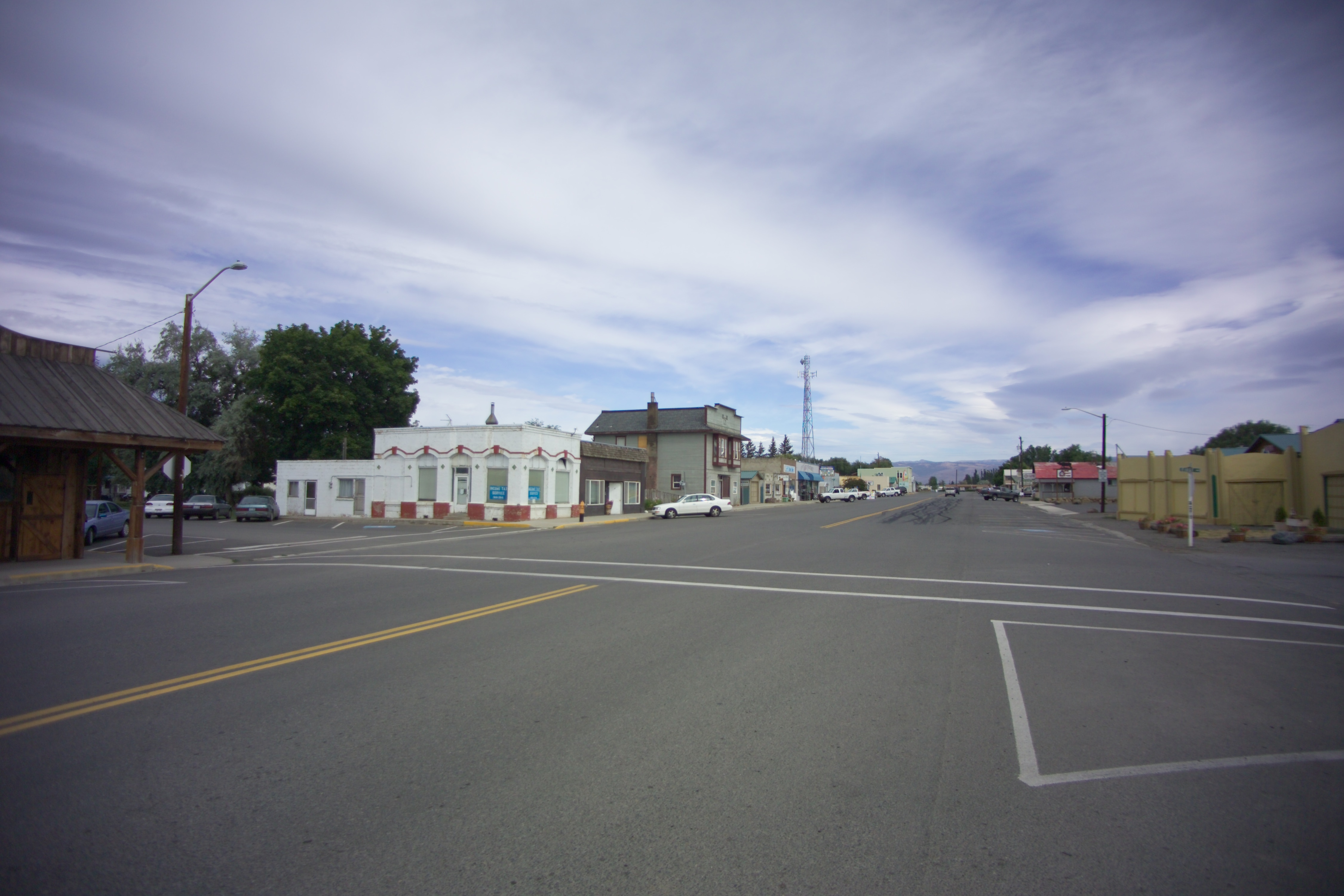
Main Street

== History ==
Kittitas was established in 1883 and officially incorporated on December 9, 1931. It was founded as part of the westward expansion of the Chicago, Milwaukee, St. Paul and Pacific Railroad. The Kittitas Yard and Depot became the center of the community of Kittitas, one of the many small, agricultural towns that sprang up along the railroad lines. The railroad linked Kittitas to other small communities and the rest of the country, providing farmers and business people a way to sell their products in other towns and cities.

A post office, general merchandise and drug store, a Baptist church, agricultural warehouses, and other small businesses were built around the small depot. Along with the depot, the Kittitas Yard included storage and maintenance buildings, a water tower, and other structures necessary for the maintenance of a major transcontinental railroad.

The depot is the only significant structure still intact at the Kittitas Yard. It is an excellent example of turn-of-the-century railroad architecture, and as such was placed on the National Register of Historic Places in 1992. The depot is owned and managed by the Washington State Parks and Recreation Commission.

The Milwaukee Road, the popular name for the Chicago, Milwaukee, St. Paul, and Pacific Railroad, was founded in 1847 to serve the area from Mississippi to Wisconsin. Within 50 years, it became one of the most prosperous railroads in the country. In 1905, Milwaukee Road officials began expanding west, running lines from Chicago to Seattle. At the same time, they decided to electrify the lines through the western mountains, to increase operating efficiency. Despite the increased efficiency, the financial stability of the railroad began to crumble, prompted by the high cost of the western expansion, electrical expenses, and competition with other railroads and ships using the newly opened Panama Canal. In 1980, the last Milwaukee train traveled over the Cascades, and thereafter the system served only the Midwest.

The Milwaukee Road once served as a vital link, providing economic and social connections between small, scattered communities in Washington. Today, it is once more a link between these communities, for people who hike, bike, or ride horses along the route. Stretching more than 250 miles (400 km) from Cedar Falls near North Bend to Tekoa at the Idaho border, the John Wayne Pioneer Trail passes through tunnels, over mountains, along rivers and lakes, and through dry, sagebrush countryside.

== Geography ==
Kittitas is located in eastern Kittitas County. Interstate 90 passes through the south end of the city, with access from Exit 115. I-90 leads west 115 miles (185 km) to Seattle and east 166 miles (267 km) to Spokane. Ellensburg, the Kittitas county seat, is 7 miles (11 km) to the west.

According to the United States Census Bureau, the city has a total area of 0.76 square miles (1.97 km^{2}), all of it land.

=== Climate ===
This region experiences warm and dry summers, with no average monthly temperatures above 71.6 °F. According to the Köppen Climate Classification system, Kittitas has a warm-summer Mediterranean climate, abbreviated "Csb" on climate maps.

== Demographics ==
Historical population
Census	Pop.	Note	%±
1920	200		—
1930	244		22.0%
1940	501		105.3%
1950	586		17.0%
1960	536		−8.5%
1970	637		18.8%
1980	782		22.8%
1990	843		7.8%
2000	1,105		31.1%
2010	1,381		25.0%
2020	1,438		4.1%
U.S. Decennial Census

=== 2020 census ===
As of the 2020 census, Kittitas had a population of 1,438. The median age was 34.2 years, with 26.7% of residents under the age of 18 and 15.1% aged 65 or older. For every 100 females there were 100.3 males, and for every 100 females age 18 and over there were 102.7 males age 18 and over.

0.0% of residents lived in urban areas, while 100.0% lived in rural areas.

There were 563 households in Kittitas, of which 35.5% had children under the age of 18 living in them. Of all households, 43.3% were married-couple households, 25.2% were households with a male householder and no spouse or partner present, and 24.9% were households with a female householder and no spouse or partner present. About 27.1% of all households were made up of individuals and 12.3% had someone living alone who was 65 years of age or older. There were 591 housing units, of which 4.7% were vacant. The homeowner vacancy rate was 1.9% and the rental vacancy rate was 3.8%.

Racial composition as of the 2020 census
Race	Number	Percent
White	1,107	77.0%
Black or African American	3	0.2%
American Indian and Alaska Native	19	1.3%
Asian	3	0.2%
Native Hawaiian and Other Pacific Islander	0	0.0%
Some other race	170	11.8%
Two or more races	136	9.5%
Hispanic or Latino (of any race)	304	21.1%

=== 2010 census ===
As of the 2010 census, there were 1,381 people, 543 households, and 366 families residing in the city. The population density was 1,817.1 inhabitants per square mile (701.6/km^{2}). There were 579 housing units at an average density of 761.8 per square mile (294.1/km^{2}). The racial makeup of the city was 86.7% White, 0.6% African American, 0.9% Native American, 0.3% Asian, 8.2% from other races, and 3.3% from two or more races. Hispanic or Latino of any race were 13.1% of the population.

There were 543 households, of which 39.2% had children under the age of 18 living with them, 47.1% were married couples living together, 14.7% had a female householder with no husband present, 5.5% had a male householder with no wife present, and 32.6% were non-families. 27.3% of all households were made up of individuals, and 9.6% had someone living alone who was 65 years of age or older. The average household size was 2.54 and the average family size was 3.05.

The median age in the city was 33.3 years. 28.4% of residents were under the age of 18; 10.1% were between the ages of 18 and 24; 26.9% were from 25 to 44; 21.9% were from 45 to 64; and 12.7% were 65 years of age or older. The gender makeup of the city was 50.4% male and 49.6% female.

=== 2000 census ===
As of the 2000 census, there were 1,105 people, 443 households, and 295 families residing in the city. The population density was 1,813.7 people per square mile (699.4/km^{2}). There were 510 housing units at an average density of 837.1 per square mile (322.8/km^{2}). The racial makeup of the city was 92.13% White, 0.63% African American, 1.18% Native American, 0.09% Asian, 0.18% Pacific Islander, 4.62% from other races, and 1.18% from two or more races. Hispanic or Latino of any race were 11.58% of the population.

There were 443 households, out of which 34.5% had children under the age of 18 living with them, 49.4% were married couples living together, 11.3% had a female householder with no husband present, and 33.4% were non-families. 27.3% of all households were made up of individuals, and 8.8% had someone living alone who was 65 years of age or older. The average household size was 2.49 and the average family size was 3.02.

In the city, the population was spread out, with 29.1% under the age of 18, 9.8% from 18 to 24, 30.3% from 25 to 44, 19.8% from 45 to 64, and 11.0% who were 65 years of age or older. The median age was 32 years. For every 100 females, there were 94.9 males. For every 100 females age 18 and over, there were 98.2 males.

The median income for a household in the city was $26,985, and the median income for a family was $31,382. Males had a median income of $29,803 versus $20,563 for females. The per capita income for the city was $11,589. About 18.2% of families and 24.8% of the population were below the poverty line, including 29.2% of those under age 18 and 11.4% of those age 65 or over.
