= Snoqualmie Pass =

Mountain pass in Washington, U.S.

- Looking down at Snoqualmie Pass from Guye Peak

- Location within Washington (state) Location within the United States
- Elevation: 3,015 ft (919 m)
- Traversed by: I-90

Location
- Location: King / Kittitas counties, Washington, U.S.
- Range: Cascade Range
- Coordinates: 47°25′24″N 121°24′39″W

Snoqualmie Pass is a mountain pass that carries Interstate 90 (I-90) through the Cascade Range in the U.S. state of Washington. The pass summit is at an elevation of 3,015 feet (919 m), on the county line between Kittitas County and King County.

Snoqualmie Pass has the lowest elevation of the three east–west mountain routes across Washington State that are kept open year-round, along with Stevens Pass (US 2) to the north, and White Pass (US 12) to the south. I-90 is the primary commercial artery between Seattle and points east, carrying an average of 29,000 vehicles through the pass per day. I-90 is the only divided highway crossing east–west through the state. (Note: Interstate 84 is on the Oregon side of the Columbia Gorge, and carries traffic diverted during pass closures.)

The pass lends its name to a census-designated place (CDP) located at the summit (Snoqualmie Pass, Washington). Both the CDP and Snoqualmie Pass are named after the Snoqualmie people of the valley to the west.

== Climate ==
The Snoqualmie Pass foothills (below ~1-2000 ft elevation) have a Csb (warm-summer mediterranean) climate, but climbing higher into the Cascades advances through a microclimate (warm-summer mediterranean continental, Dsb) characterized by considerable precipitation, especially during winter, and at times hazardous conditions for travelers. The average annual precipitation is over 100 inches; snowfall averages over 400 inches. The average annual number of days with measurable precipitation is over 170. Frosts can occur at any time of year, and snow can fall any time outside midsummer.

The summit of Snoqualmie Pass is in hardiness zone 7b, with a yearly mean minimum of 9 °F (−13 °C).

Climate data for Snoqualmie Pass
Month	Jan	Feb	Mar	Apr	May	Jun	Jul	Aug	Sep	Oct	Nov	Dec	Year
Record high °F (°C)	56 (13)	61 (16)	67 (19)	81 (27)	84 (29)	94 (34)	101 (38)	101 (38)	101 (38)	88 (31)	65 (18)	53 (12)	101 (38)
Mean daily maximum °F (°C)	32.4 (0.2)	37.1 (2.8)	42.1 (5.6)	48.9 (9.4)	56.3 (13.5)	62.9 (17.2)	70.3 (21.3)	69.3 (20.7)	63.9 (17.7)	53.8 (12.1)	39.9 (4.4)	33.7 (0.9)	50.9 (10.5)
Mean daily minimum °F (°C)	20.9 (−6.2)	23.3 (−4.8)	26.0 (−3.3)	30.0 (−1.1)	34.2 (1.2)	40.0 (4.4)	45.6 (7.6)	45.7 (7.6)	41.1 (5.1)	35.0 (1.7)	28.2 (−2.1)	23.5 (−4.7)	32.8 (0.4)
Record low °F (°C)	−17 (−27)	−15 (−26)	0 (−18)	7 (−14)	21 (−6)	27 (−3)	31 (−1)	27 (−3)	22 (−6)	11 (−12)	0 (−18)	−19 (−28)	−19 (−28)
Average precipitation inches (mm)	15.69 (399)	11.89 (302)	10.65 (271)	5.99 (152)	3.87 (98)	3.74 (95)	1.38 (35)	2.23 (57)	4.51 (115)	9.32 (237)	13.59 (345)	17.17 (436)	100.05 (2,541)
Average snowfall inches (cm)	104.4 (265)	75.3 (191)	69.6 (177)	25.8 (66)	5.5 (14)	0.3 (0.76)	0.1 (0.25)	0.0 (0.0)	0.2 (0.51)	7.4 (19)	44.6 (113)	86.9 (221)	420.1 (1,067.52)

The rapidly changing conditions require special cautions, relayed to motorists via variable message displays along I-90. Depending on traction they may call for tire chains to be installed, usually on large trucks but occasionally on smaller vehicles as well. Chain-up areas are provided along the side of the Interstate to facilitate the placement of chains. The pass has been subjected to closures when weather conditions become extreme.

A snow shed, constructed in 1950 when the road was known as US 10, formerly covered the westbound lanes, but it has been replaced by avalanche bridges that stand away from the slope to allow slides to pass under the road, as of April 2014. WSDOT maintains cameras at selected locations along the pass to monitor weather conditions. Some of these cameras can be viewed via the internet.

== Recreation ==
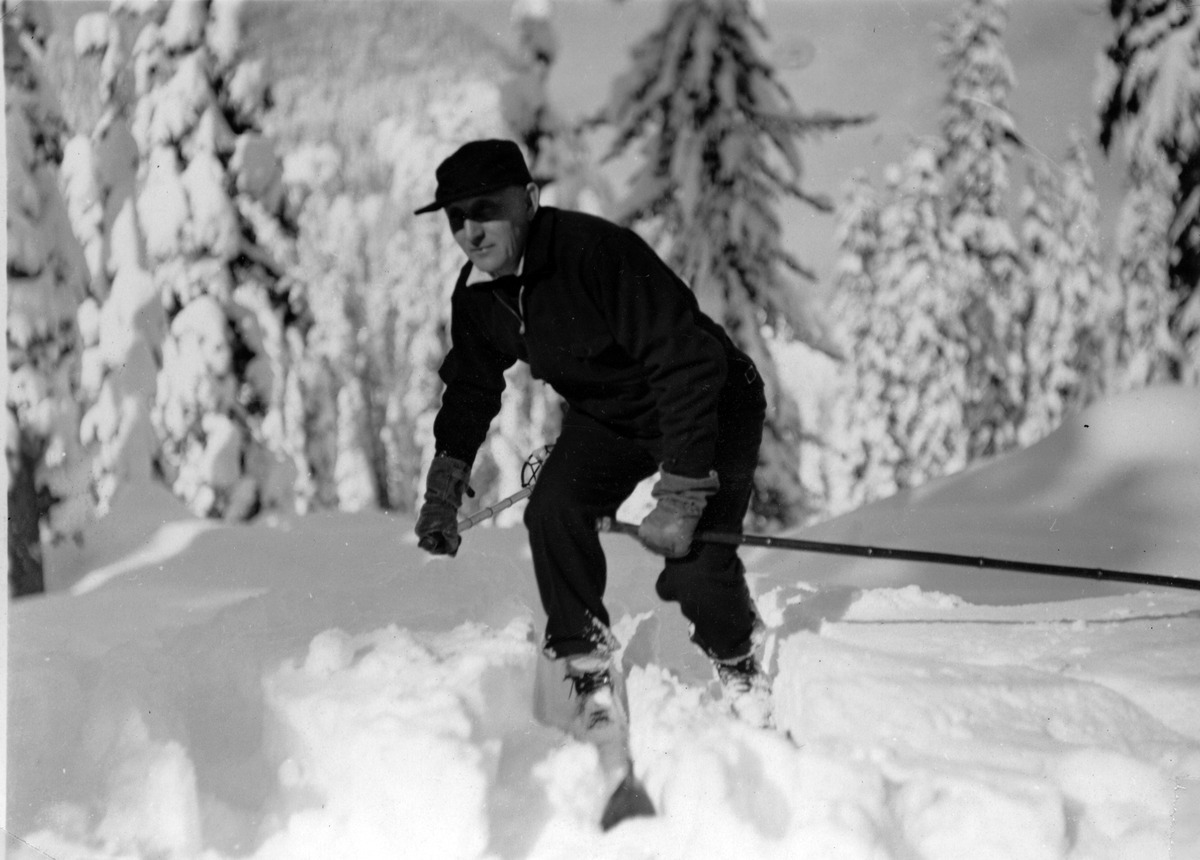
Ben Evans, Director of Playfields of the Seattle Parks Department, skiing at Snoqualmie Pass, 1935.

The area around Snoqualmie Pass consists of mountain chalets that are mainly seasonally occupied by residents of the Seattle metropolitan area, with approximately 150 year-round residents. Winter sports are the main draw, but outdoor recreation is available year-round.

The Pacific Crest Trail crosses through Snoqualmie Pass and a variety of other trails are also available for hiking and climbing in the summer, cross-country skiing and snowshoeing during the winter months.

The Seattle Parks Department opened the Seattle Ski Park at Snoqualmie Pass on January 21, 1934. It was the first municipally owned ski facility in the United States and was promoted by mayor John F. Dore. The city government closed the ski hill in 1940. Snoqualmie Pass is now the site of the Summit at Snoqualmie, a group of alpine ski areas managed by Boyne USA Resorts. It is the closest ski area to Seattle. The Summit consists of four ski areas: Alpental, Summit West (formerly named Snoqualmie Summit), Summit Central (formerly Ski Acres), and Summit East (formerly Hyak).

Snowmobiling just east of the pass is also popular during the winter months. Also in the summer and fall, paragliders and hang gliders may be seen flying above the valley, along the ridge and landing at Lake Keechelus.

== History ==
Variable speed limit sign along I-90

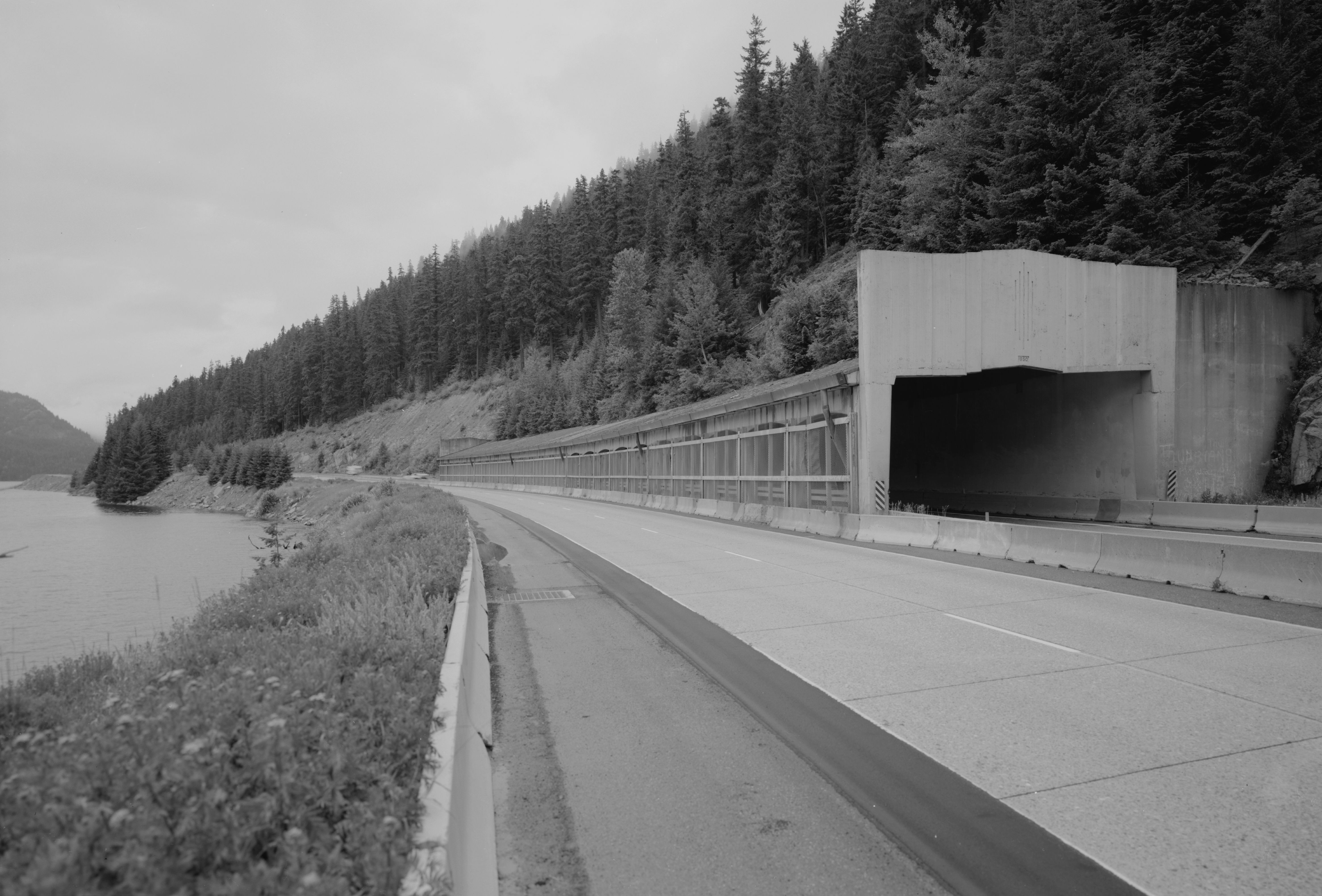
Snowshed constructed 1950, removed in 2014.

Snoqualmie Pass was well known to the Native Americans of the region. Hudson's Bay Company trappers and traders were active in the Snoqualmie and Yakima valleys during the early 19th century. They knew about Snoqualmie Pass but information about their use of it is vague. A possible early use of the pass was that of A.C. Anderson, who drove cattle across the Cascades in 1841, via a pass he called "Sinahomish Pass".

Captain George B. McClellan and his lieutenant Abiel W. Tinkham explored the Snoqualmie Pass region in 1853 and 1854. Their goal was to find a pass better suited for a railroad than Naches Pass, where the Naches Trail crossed the Cascade Mountains. They explored from the east side of the mountains, reaching the vicinity of Yakima Pass (47.3365°N 121.4324°W). Tinkham continued down the west side via the Cedar River. McClellan decided not to examine Snoqualmie Pass itself because of unfavorable reports from Natives.

In 1856, Major J.H.H. Van Bokkelen, then of the Washington Territory Volunteers (militia), crossed Snoqualmie Pass on a scouting mission. In 1858 several large pack trains bound for mines east of the Cascades crossed the pass. In 1865 a number of Seattle citizens, including Arthur A. Denny, explored the Cedar River, Snoqualmie Pass, and Naches Pass. They reported that Snoqualmie Pass route was a better choice for a road than the old Indian trail over Yakima Pass. By 1867 a toll road had been built over Snoqualmie Pass. Intended to be suitable for wagons, for years the road was usable only by pack trains and for cattle drives.

The Chicago, Milwaukee, St. Paul and Pacific Railroad (the "Milwaukee Road") completed a line through Snoqualmie Pass in 1909, part of its Pacific Extension. This grade was soon replaced in 1914 by the 2¼-mile (3.6 km) Snoqualmie Tunnel, from Hyak due west to Rockdale, at an approximate elevation of 2,600 feet (790 m), more than 400 feet (120 m) below the pass. The rail line was abandoned 46 years ago in 1980, and the tunnel is currently a multi-use trail for bicyclists and hikers, part of Iron Horse State Park. During tunnel construction, an improved wagon road was built over the pass. Near the original rail line, the Sunset Highway was opened through the pass in 1915.

In 1927, the road over the pass became U.S. Route 10; it began to be plowed and kept open during winter in 1931. By 1933, the first alpine ski hill was cleared at Snoqualmie Pass, and U.S. 10 was finally paved in 1934.

In 1946, tunnel engineer Ole Singstad proposed the construction of a tunnel under Snoqualmie Pass to avoid the most treacherous section of the route. On June 24, 1946, seven players on the Spokane Indians minor league baseball team, and their manager, were killed when their bus veered through a guard rail on the Snoqualmie Pass Highway and plunged down a 500-foot embankment and into a ravine.

In 1969, construction of U.S. 10's replacement, Interstate 90, began across the pass.

Since 1991, the Mountains to Sound Greenway Trust has acted to protect the scenic value of the I-90 corridor over Snoqualmie Pass.

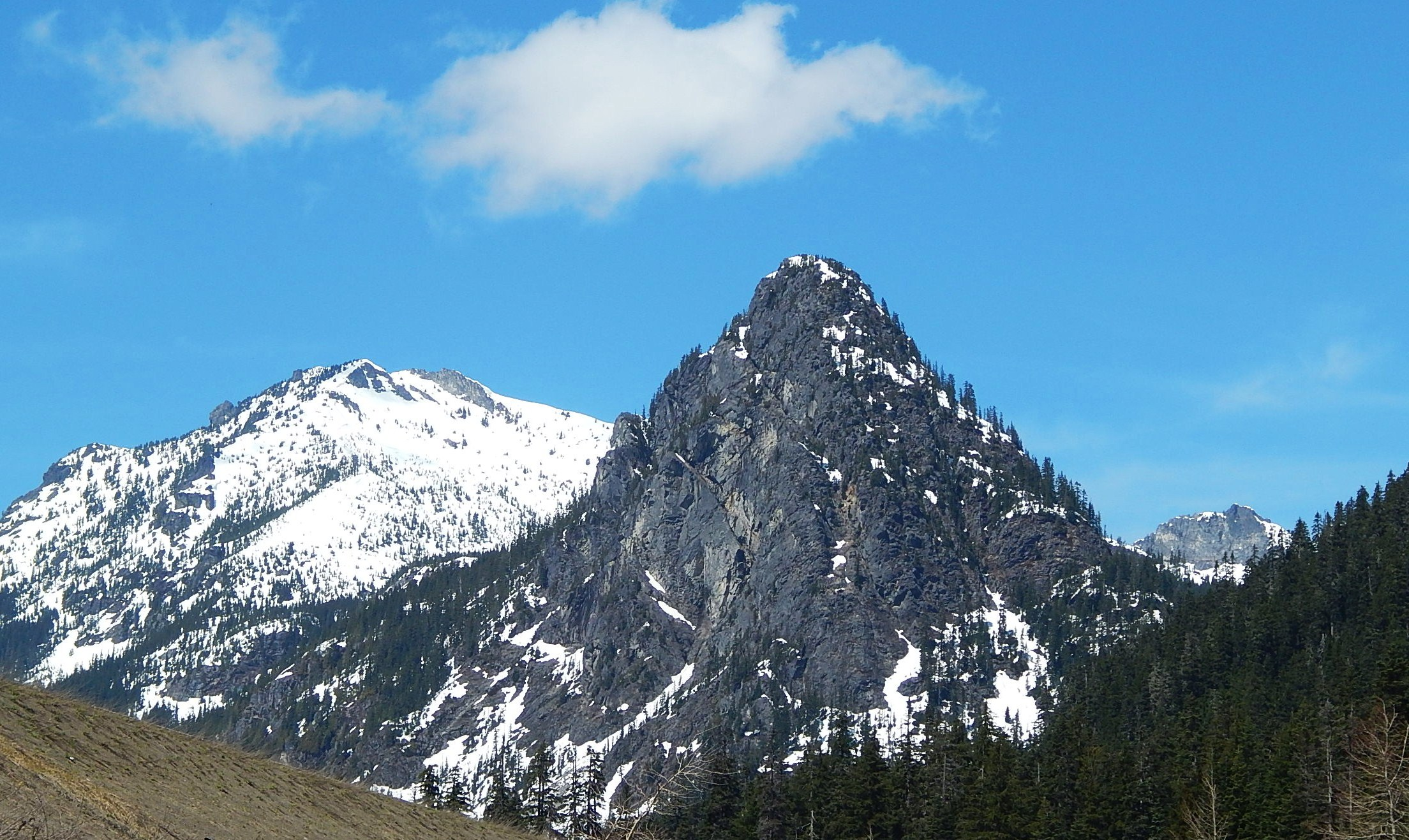
Snoqualmie Pass landmarks

== See also ==
- Iron Horse State Park
- White Pass
- Stevens Pass
- Walter Steinhart
