= Palouse to Cascades State Park Trail =

Rail trail in Washington State

Coordinates: 47°13′45″N 117°14′59″W

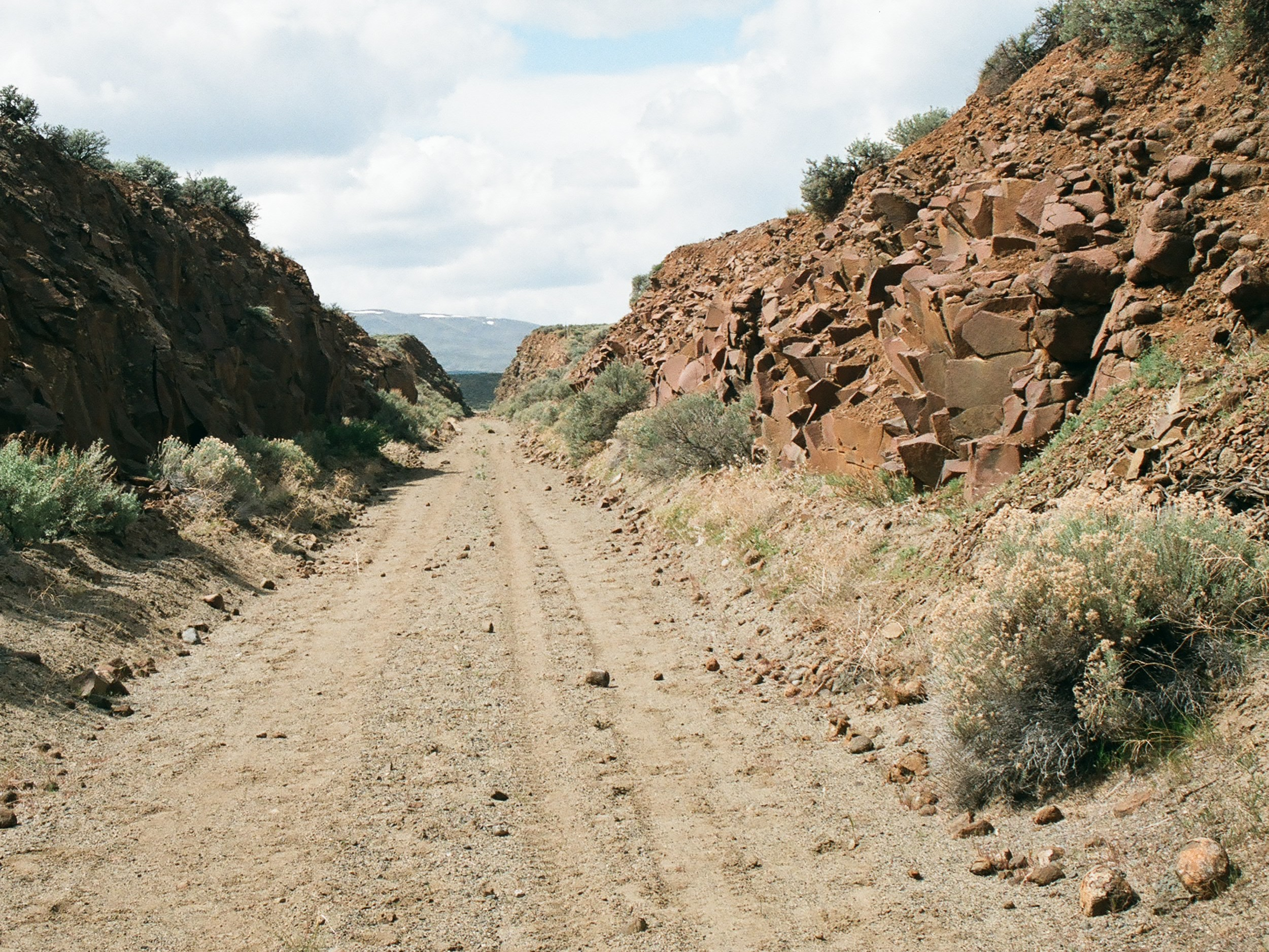
- Rail cut in the eastern end of the Iron Horse State Park portion of the Palouse to Cascades State Park Trail as it nears the Columbia River south of Vantage
- Length: 285 miles (459 km)
- Location: Washington, United States
- Established: 1981
- Use: Hiking
- Season: Year-round
- Surface: Gravel
- Right of way: Railways
- Maintainer: Washington State Parks and Recreation Commission

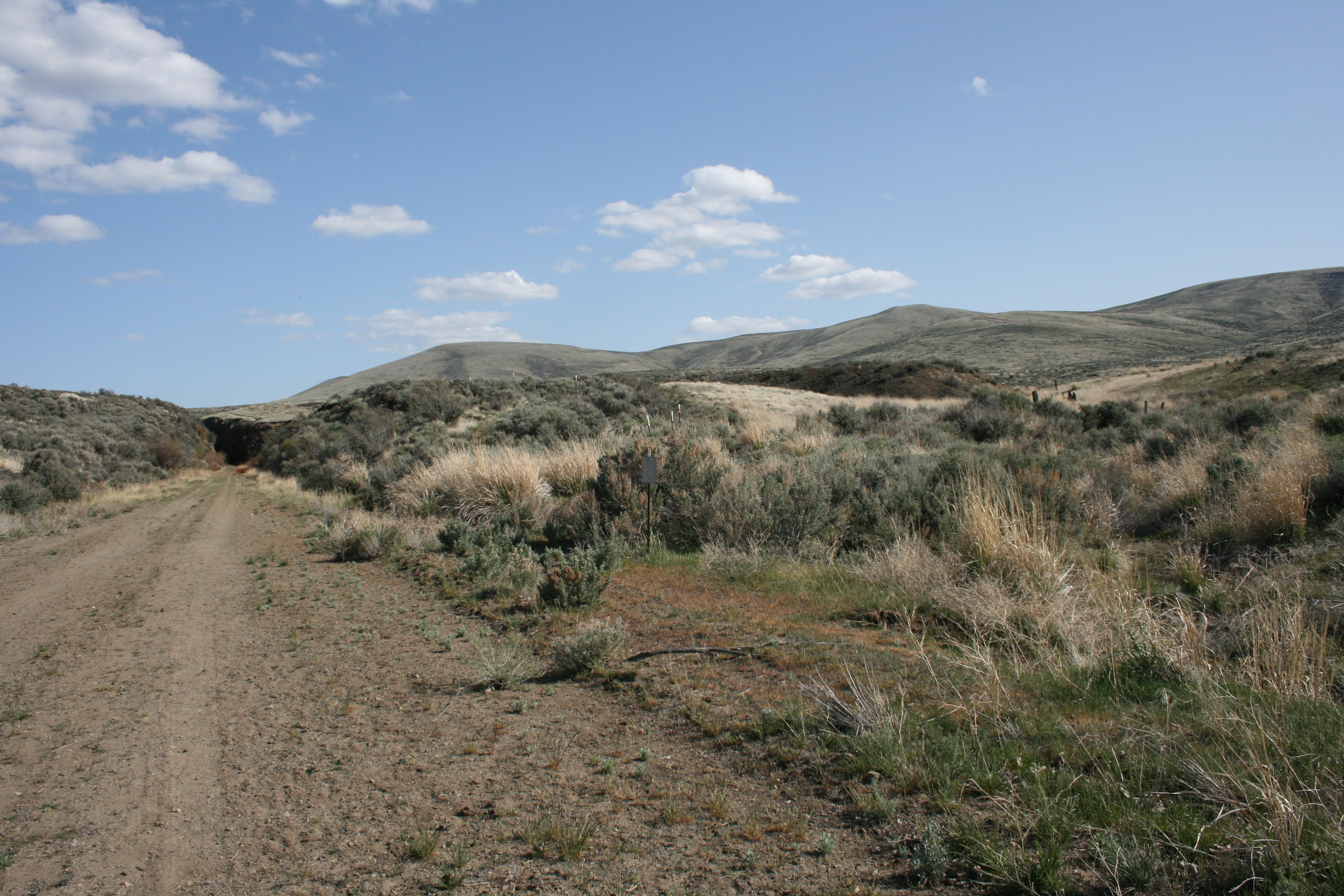
The Saddle Mountains as seen from the Palouse to Cascades State Park Trail. Photo looking east southeasterly at Boylston tunnel

The Palouse to Cascades State Park Trail, formerly known as the John Wayne Pioneer Trail and the Iron Horse Trail, is a rail trail that spans most of the U.S. state of Washington. It follows the former railway roadbed of the Chicago, Milwaukee, St. Paul & Pacific Railroad (Milwaukee Road) for 300 miles (480 km) across two-thirds of the state, from the western slopes of the Cascade Mountains to the Idaho border.

The former Milwaukee Road roadbed was acquired by the state of Washington via a quitclaim deed, and is used as a non-motorized recreational trail managed by the Washington State Parks and Recreation Commission and by the Washington State Department of Natural Resources. State legislation "railbanked" the corridor with provisions that allow for the reversion to railroad usage in the future.

== History ==
The trail was originally a railroad line which was decommissioned between 1980 and 1987. Afterwards, establishing a public right-of-way trail on the land was championed by various people and organizations, especially by Chic Hollenbeck, who founded the John Wayne Pioneer Wagons and Riders Association in the 1980s. Beginning in 1981, Hollenbeck and his organization organized annual horse and wagon rides across Washington along the trail. The organization aimed to fortify the public ownership of the land, in opposition to nearby private property owners' extralegal efforts to exert control over the land for their own use. When it was officially established, the eastern part of the trail took on the name "John Wayne Trail" after the organization that lobbied for its existence, themselves being named after actor John Wayne, while the western 100-mile (160 km) portion from Cedar Falls (near North Bend) to the Columbia River south of Vantage was named the "Iron Horse Trail" and had been developed and managed as the Iron Horse State Park.

In 2002, it was designated a National Recreation Trail.

In 2015, two Washington state representatives from the 9th district attempted to include language in an amendment to the state's 2015 capital budget that would close a 130-mile-long (210 km) section of the trail east of the Columbia River. It was later revealed that a typo, referring to the closed section as "from the Columbia River to the Columbia River", nullified the amendment temporarily.

In April 2018, Washington State Parks proposed renaming the trail and Iron Horse State Park to resolve confusion. Additionally, the name did not conform to the State Parks naming policies. The Washington State Parks and Recreation Commission adopted a new name, the Palouse to Cascades State Park Trail, in May of that year.

In April 2022, the Beverly Railroad Bridge across the Columbia River reopened to provide access for hikers, cyclists, and horse riders following the trail. The railroad trestle, south of Vantage, was renovated at a cost of $5.5 million by the state government. Other sections of the trail in Eastern Washington remain unfinished or in need of replacement.

== Trail features ==
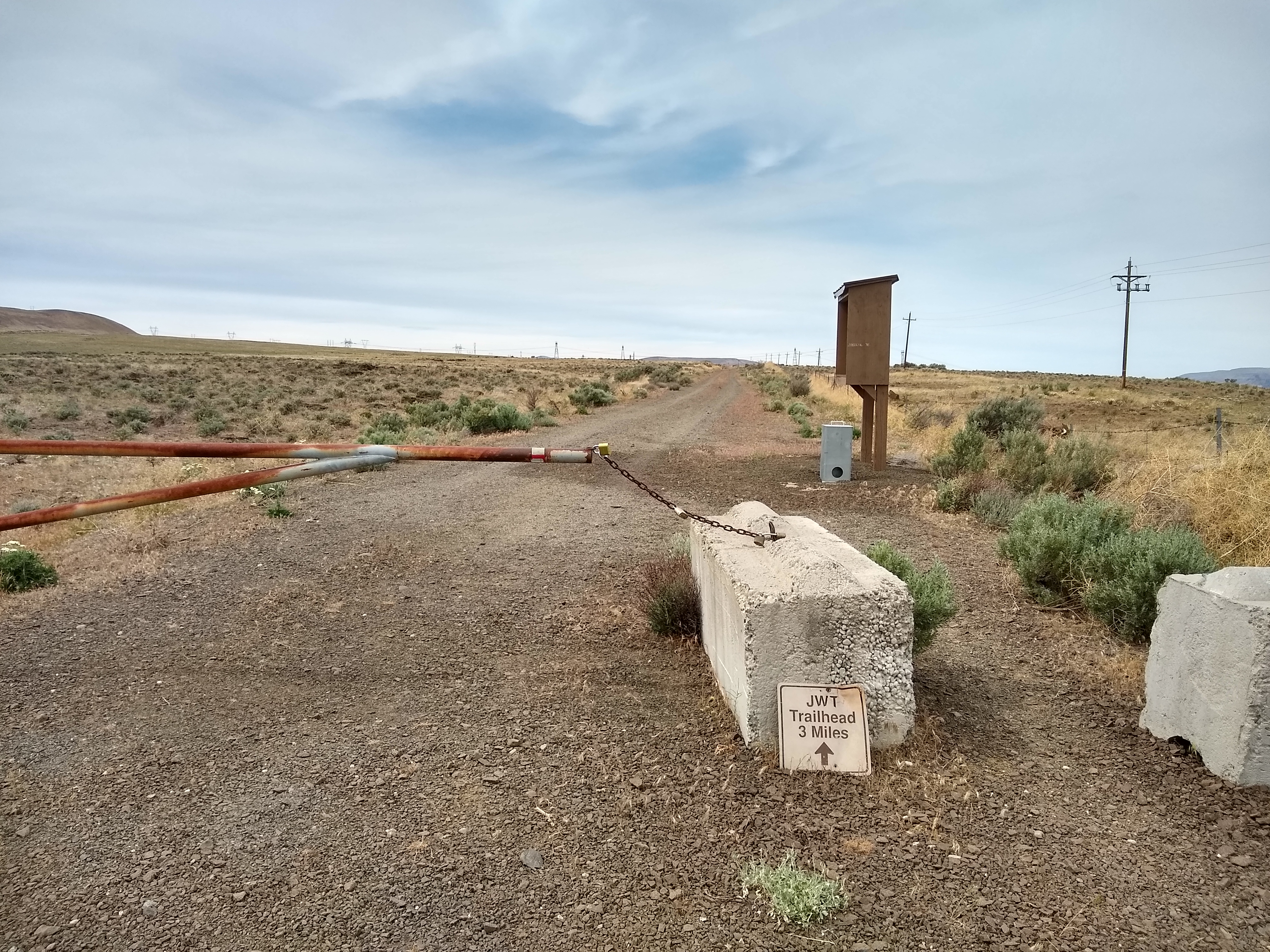
Army West Trailhead near Beverly, Washington

=== Iron Horse Park access ===
Access points to the developed portion of the trail, managed by Washington State Parks and Recreation Commission, are at:

- Rattlesnake Lake, Cedar Falls – western terminus and connection to the Snoqualmie Valley Regional Trail
- Twin Falls
- Hyak – provides access to the 2.3-mile-long (3.7 km) Snoqualmie Tunnel through the crest of the Cascade Mountains. In winter this site provides a public sledding area and ski trails groomed for track and skate style cross country skiing from Hyak eastward. Washington DOT Sno-pass parking is required at this site in winter. Within walking/snowing/skiing distance is a state parks owned lodge.
- Easton – descending the eastern slope of the Cascades
- Cle Elum – provides access to the Upper Yakima River Canyon
- Thorp – near the historic Thorp Mill
- Kittitas, Washington – in the open farm valley of the Yakima River drainage east of Ellensburg, Washington
- Army West – at the western edge of the stretch passing through the shrub-steppe country of the U.S. Army's Yakima Training Center
- Army East – at the eastern edge of the stretch passing through the Yakima Training Center as it reaches the Columbia River

=== Tunnels ===
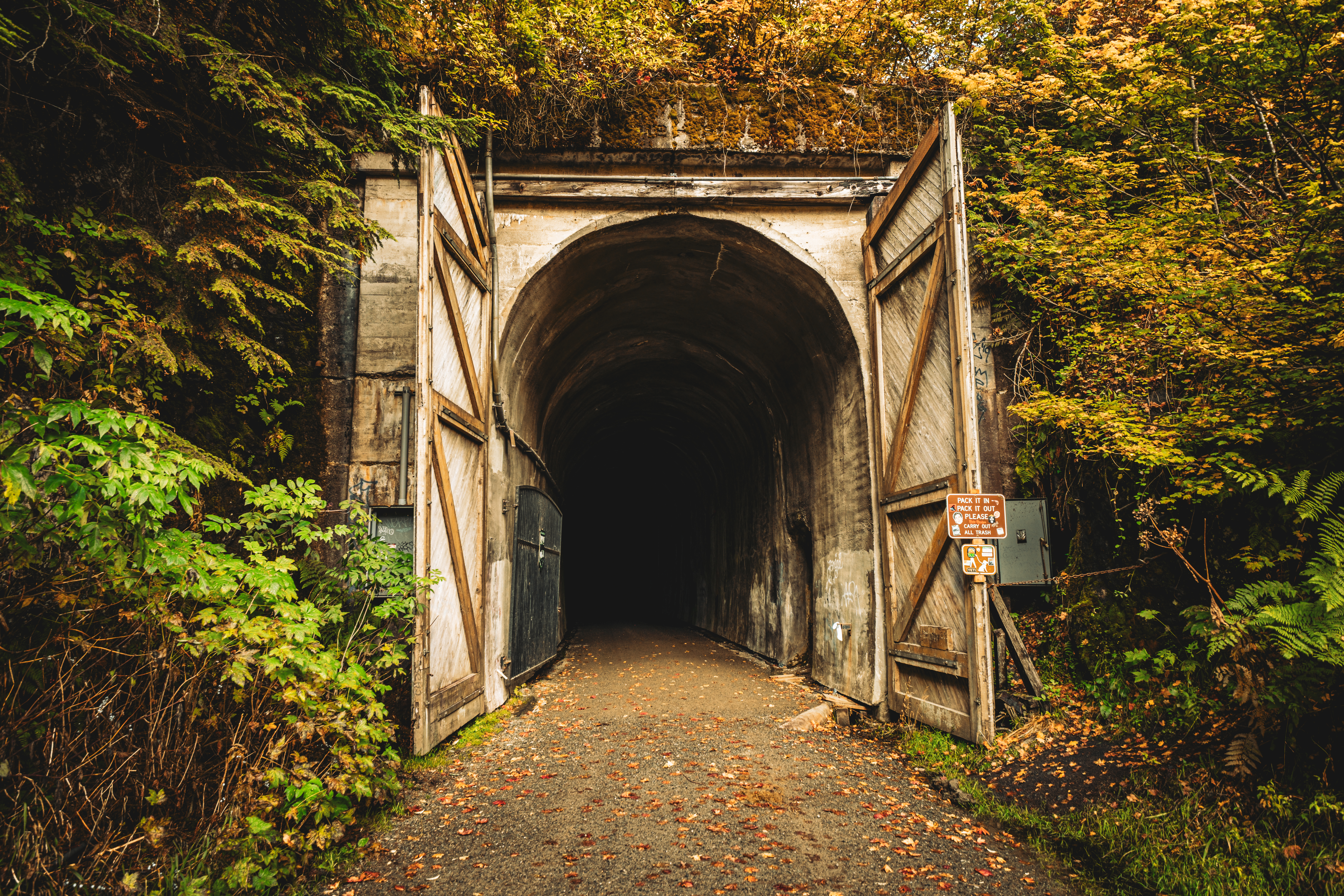
The east portal of the Snoqualmie Tunnel at Hyak, Washington, on the Palouse to Cascades State Park Trail.

The trail features six tunnels, including the 11,894-foot (3,625 m) Snoqualmie Tunnel, which was #50 on the railroad's numbering system. The other five tunnels in order are the Boylston (#45), Thorp (#46), Picnic Area (#47), Easton (#48) and Whittier (#49). The Boylston Tunnel was also known as the Johnson Creek tunnel to the railroad and sometimes tunnels #46 and #47 are known as the Thorp Tunnels.

=== Undeveloped ===
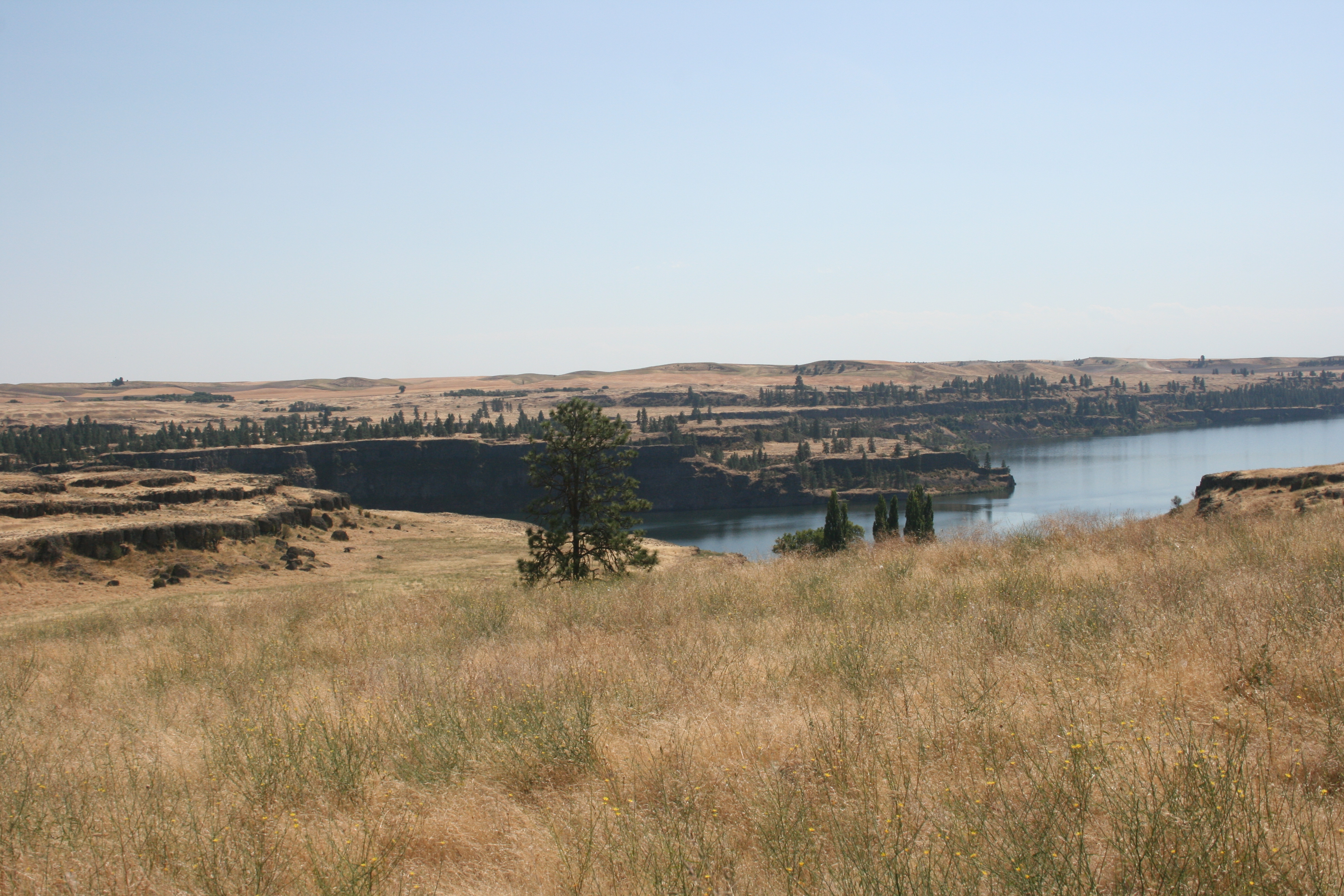
The trail runs along the east side of Rock Lake in the Rock Creek drainage; the former railroad grade climbing the basalt walls of the lake can be seen

Access points to the undeveloped portion of the trail, managed by Washington State Department of Natural Resources, have not been formally opened to the public. However, the trail provides access to the unique geological erosion features of the Channeled Scablands regions of the state of Washington, and several stretches have been recognized as providing access to this area created by the cataclysmic Missoula Floods that swept periodically across eastern Washington and down the Columbia River Plateau during the Pleistocene epoch. At Malden, once home to the largest railroad turntable in the world, Washington State Parks is planning a trailhead in the former rail yard.

== Iron Horse State Park ==
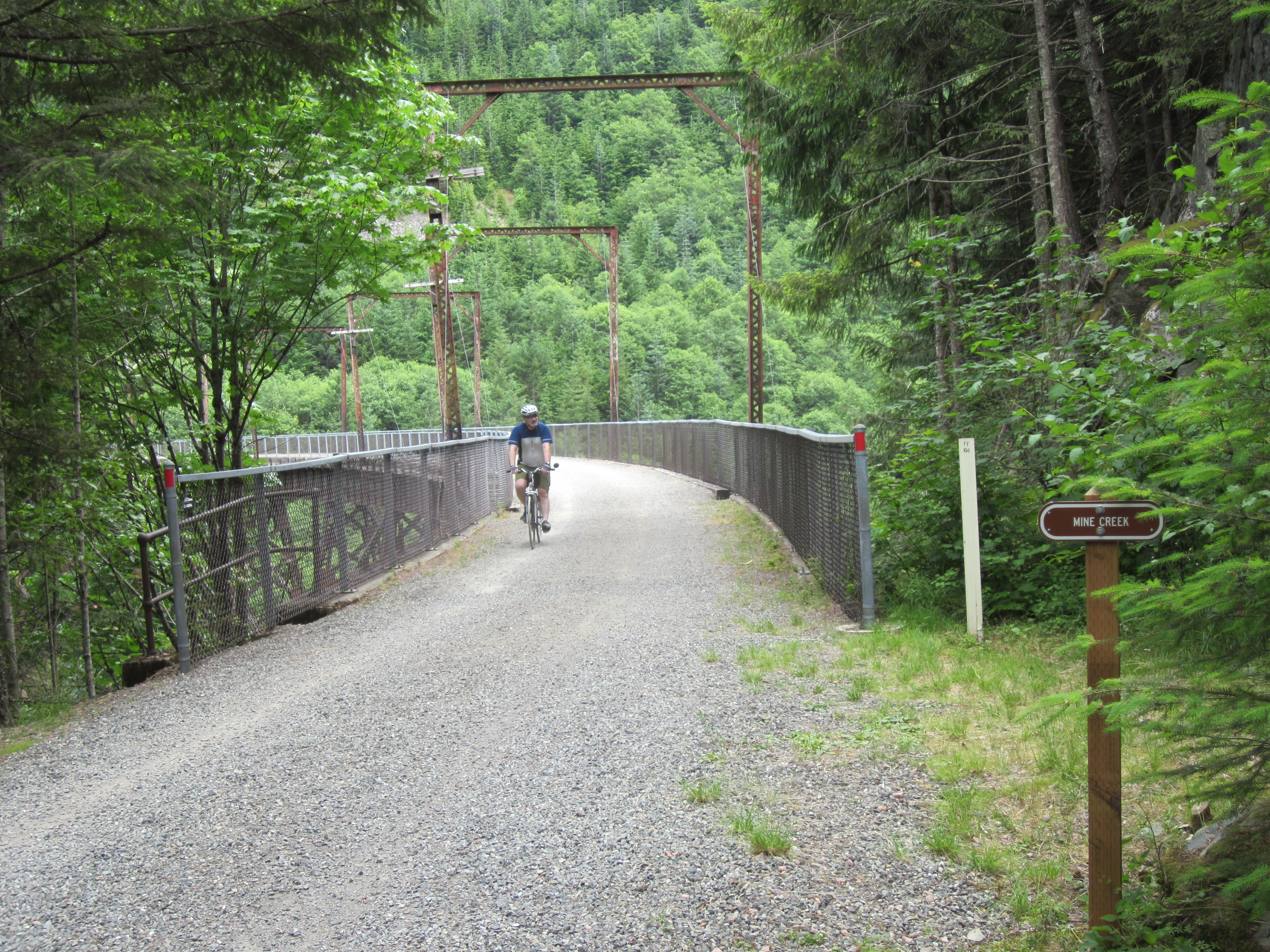
Mine Creek Trestle in Iron Horse State Park near Snoqualmie Pass

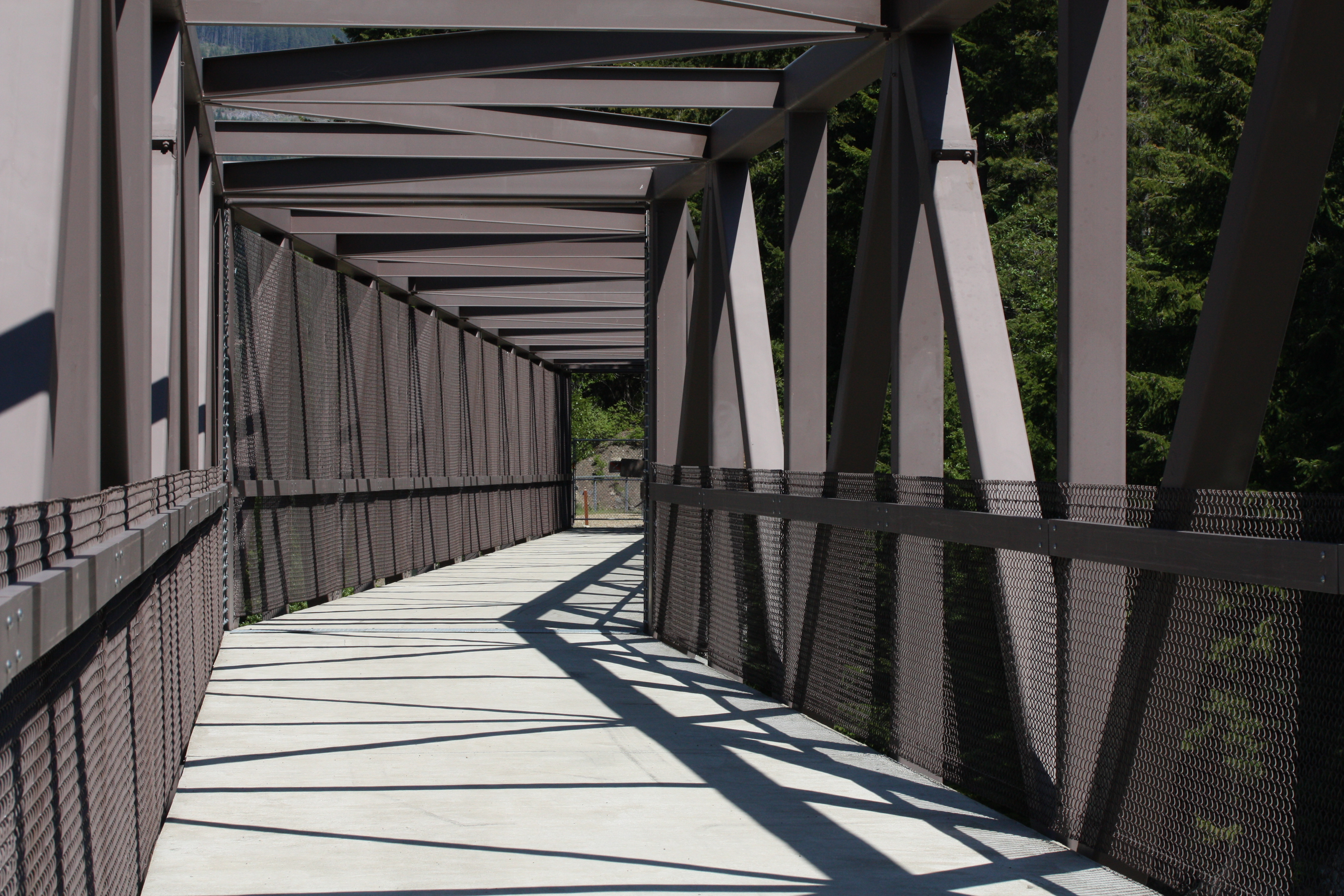
Bridge across the Yakima River and the BNSF Railway line at Lake Easton

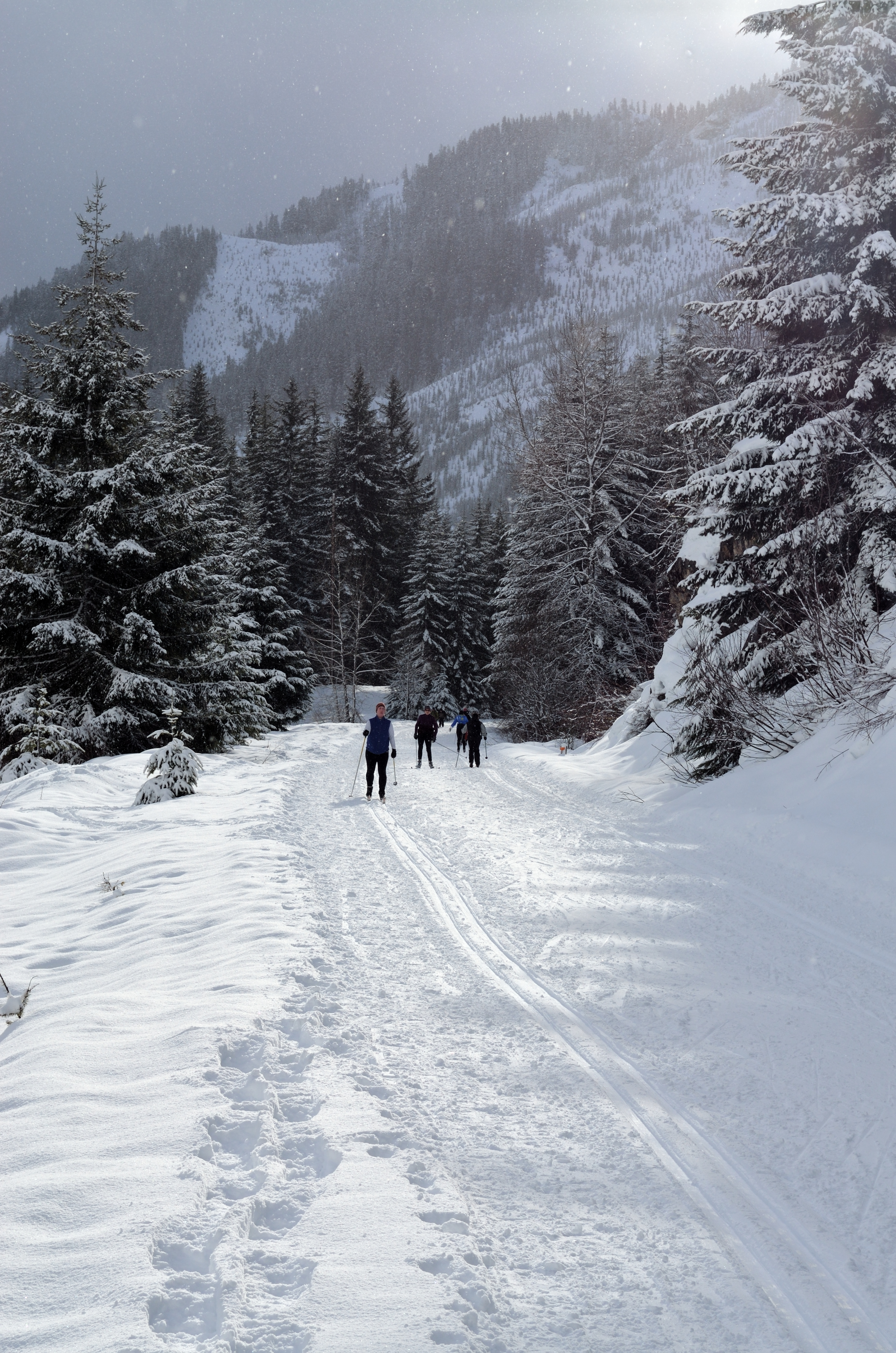
Cross-country skiing on the Iron Horse State Park trail

Iron Horse State Park, part of the Washington State Park System and the Palouse to Cascades State Park Trail, is a 1,612-acre (7 km^{2}) state park located in the Cascade Mountains and Yakima River Valley, between Cedar Falls on the west and the Columbia River on the east.

The park is contiguous with a rail trail that crosses Snoqualmie Pass. The trail is located within the former right-of-way of The Milwaukee Road, officially the Chicago, Milwaukee, St. Paul and Pacific Railroad. Most of the right-of-way between Cedar Falls and the Idaho border was acquired by the state, through a quitclaim deed, as a result of the railroad's 1977 bankruptcy. As part of the reorganization of the company, the railroad embargoed its lines west of Miles City, Montana, in 1980 and ceased service in Washington. The state acquired the land in the early 1980s and eventually converted the right-of-way west of the Columbia River into a 110-mile (177 km) hiking, mountain biking, and horseback riding trail. The trail continues beyond Iron Horse State Park to the Idaho border. Iron Horse State Park contains the most developed portion of the trail.

At Cedar Falls, the west end of Iron Horse State Park, the Palouse to Cascades State Park Trail connects to the Snoqualmie Valley Trail of the King County Regional Trail System. The Snoqualmie Valley Trail is built on a portion of the former Milwaukee Road branch line from Cedar Falls to Everett.

=== Recreation ===
Like most rails-to-trails projects, Iron Horse is popular with hikers and cyclists. There are many trail heads across the state, most with modern facilities, ample parking for a less common trail, and even a handful of campgrounds.

The trail passes through mostly woodland, along lakes and waterfalls, and goes directly through the divide at the old Snoqualmie Tunnel. The park is easily accessible from I-90.

Iron Horse is popular for its scenery and its history, although it is less well-known than other nearby areas like the Alpine Lakes Wilderness or Snoqualmie Falls.

The park trail continues through the Town of South Cle Elum where the preserved Milwaukee Road depot and substation, as well as the remains of the rail yard are located. The depot, substation, and rail yard are listed in the National Register of Historic Places. There is a small museum in the depot. In Kittitas, the trail passes The Milwaukee Road depot and the ruins of one of the substations. That depot is also listed in the National Register of Historic Places. In addition to these buildings, other infrastructure remains, such as tunnels and bridges.

== See also ==
- List of rail trails
- Northwest Railway Museum
- Seattle, Lake Shore and Eastern Railway
- Hyak, Washington

== Bibliography ==
- "History of the Greenway Landscape". Mountains to Sound Greenway: About the Greenway. 2006.
- Prater, Yvonne (1981). Snoqualmie Pass: From Indian Trail to Interstate. Seattle: The Mountaineers. ISBN 0-89886-015-6.
- "Snoqualmie Valley Trail". King County Regional Trail System. Department of Natural Resources and Parks, Parks and Recreation Division. September 19, 2005. Archived from the original on October 19, 2000.
- Wilma, David (January 22, 2003). "Northern Pacific Railroad establishes Tenino as a rail junction in 1872". HistoryLink.org Essay 5090.
  Wilma referenced Gordon R. Newell, So Fair A Dwelling Place: A History of Olympia and Thurston County, Washington (Olympia: The Olympia News Publishing Co., 1950), p. 27.
