= National Register of Historic Places listings in Kittitas County, Washington =

Location of Kittitas County in Washington

This is a list of the National Register of Historic Places listings in Kittitas County, Washington.

This is intended to be a complete list of the properties and districts on the National Register of Historic Places in Kittitas County, Washington, United States. Latitude and longitude coordinates are provided for many National Register properties and districts; these locations may be seen together in a map.

There are 25 properties and districts listed on the National Register in the county. Another property was once listed but has been removed.

This National Park Service list is complete through NPS recent listings posted August 7, 2026.

== Current listings ==
	Name on the Register	Image	Date listed	Location	City or town	Description
1	Beverly Railroad Bridge	Beverly Railroad Bridge	July 16, 1982 (#82004214)	Spans Columbia River; 46°49′52″N 119°56′54″W	Beverly	Historic Bridges and Tunnels in Washington TR
2	Cabin Creek Historic District	Cabin Creek Historic District	August 17, 1979 (#79002545)	West of Easton; 47°14′24″N 121°13′46″W	Easton	
3	Chicago, Milwaukee, St. Paul & Pacific Railroad-Kittitas Depot	Chicago, Milwaukee, St. Paul & Pacific Railroad-Kittitas Depot	November 19, 1992 (#92001582)	Junction of Railroad Aveve and Main Street; 46°59′03″N 120°25′05″W	Kittitas	Historic Resources of the Milwaukee Road in Washington, 1909-1945 MPS
4	Chicago, Milwaukee, St. Paul and Pacific Railroad: South Cle Elum Yard	Chicago, Milwaukee, St. Paul and Pacific Railroad: South Cle Elum Yard	April 25, 2003 (#03000305)	Near Milwaukee Road and Reservoir Canyon Road; 47°10′58″N 120°57′24″W	South Cle Elum	Historic Resources of the Milwaukee Road in Washington, 1909-1945 MPS
5	Cle Elum-Roslyn Beneficial Association Hospital	Cle Elum-Roslyn Beneficial Association Hospital	December 3, 1980 (#80004005)	505 Power Street; 47°11′48″N 120°56′40″W	Cle Elum	
6	Downtown Ellensburg Historic District	Downtown Ellensburg Historic District	July 1, 1977 (#77001341)	Roughly bounded by 3rd and 6th Avenues, and Main and Ruby Streets; 46°59′46″N 120°32′45″W	Ellensburg	Includes 1890-built Masonic Temple (Ellensburg, Washington)
7	First Railroad Addition Historic District	First Railroad Addition Historic District	May 8, 1987 (#87000722)	Roughly bounded by Tenth Avenue, D Street, Ninth Avenue, and A Street; 47°00′05″N 120°32′41″W	Ellensburg	
8	Dr. Paschal and Agnes Gray House	Dr. Paschal and Agnes Gray House	August 29, 1997 (#97001079)	606 North Main Street; 46°58′16″N 120°32′55″W	Ellensburg	
9	Kittitas County Fairgrounds	Kittitas County Fairgrounds	January 8, 1999 (#98001594)	512 North Poplar Street; 46°59′55″N 120°31′58″W	Ellensburg	
10	Lake Keechelus Snowshed Bridge	Lake Keechelus Snowshed Bridge	May 24, 1995 (#95000627)	I-90 near Snoqualmie Pass; 47°21′20″N 121°21′53″W	Hyak	Bridges of Washington State MPS, demolished April 2014
11	Liberty Historic District	Liberty Historic District	October 15, 1974 (#74001965)	Both sides of Williams Creek Wagon Rd. 47°15′15″N 120°39′53″W	Liberty	
12	Milwaukee Road Bunkhouse	Milwaukee Road Bunkhouse	March 31, 1989 (#89000210)	526 Marie; 47°10′58″N 120°57′12″W	South Cle Elum	
13	Albert Nelson Farmstead	Albert Nelson Farmstead	February 25, 1982 (#82004258)	Manastash Road; 46°58′17″N 120°36′38″W	Ellensburg	
14	Northern Pacific Railway Passenger Depot	Northern Pacific Railway Passenger Depot	September 26, 1991 (#91001438)	606 W. Third St. 46°59′40″N 120°33′25″W	Ellensburg	
15	Northwestern Improvement Company Store	Northwestern Improvement Company Store	April 13, 1973 (#73001881)	1st Street and Pennsylvania Avenue; 47°13′25″N 120°59′29″W	Roslyn	
16	Olmstead Place State Park	Olmstead Place State Park	March 31, 1971 (#71000878)	4 miles east of Ellensburg near the Kittitas Highway; 46°58′42″N 120°28′15″W	Ellensburg	
17	Ramsay House	Ramsay House	May 2, 1986 (#86000957)	215 East Ninth; 47°00′06″N 120°34′06″W	Ellensburg	
18	Roslyn Historic District	Roslyn Historic District	February 14, 1978 (#78002760)	WA 2E; 47°13′19″N 120°59′28″W	Roslyn	
19	Salmon la Sac Guard Station	Salmon la Sac Guard Station	July 15, 1974 (#74001964)	North of Cle Elum in Wenatchee National Forest; 47°24′07″N 121°05′39″W	Cle Elum	
20	Shoudy House	Shoudy House	November 12, 1992 (#92001585)	309 West Fifth Avenue; 46°59′49″N 120°32′59″W	Ellensburg	
21	Springfield Farm		April 13, 1977 (#77001342)	9 miles north of Ellensburg; 47°07′53″N 120°35′10″W	Ellensburg	
22	Tekison Cave	Tekison Cave	November 24, 1978 (#78002761)	Address Restricted	Wenatchee	
23	Thorp Grade School	Thorp Grade School	July 16, 2009 (#09000541)	10831 North Thorp Highway; 47°04′14″N 120°40′37″W	Thorp	Rural Public Schools of Washington State MPS
24	Thorp Mill	Thorp Mill	November 23, 1977 (#77001343)	Thorp Highway off U.S. 10; 47°04′27″N 120°41′01″W	Thorp	
25	Washington State Normal School Building	Washington State Normal School Building	December 12, 1976 (#76001896)	8th Avenue; 47°00′01″N 120°32′27″W	Ellensburg	

== Former listings ==
	Name on the Register	Image	Date listed	Date removed	Location	City or town	Description
1	John W. Kinkade Farmstead	John W. Kinkade Farmstead	February 25, 1982 (#82004257)	February 5, 2001	Off US 7B	Ellensburg vicinity	Listed in 1982.

== See also ==
- National Register of Historic Places listings in Washington state
