= Thorp Mill =

- U.S. National Register of Historic Places
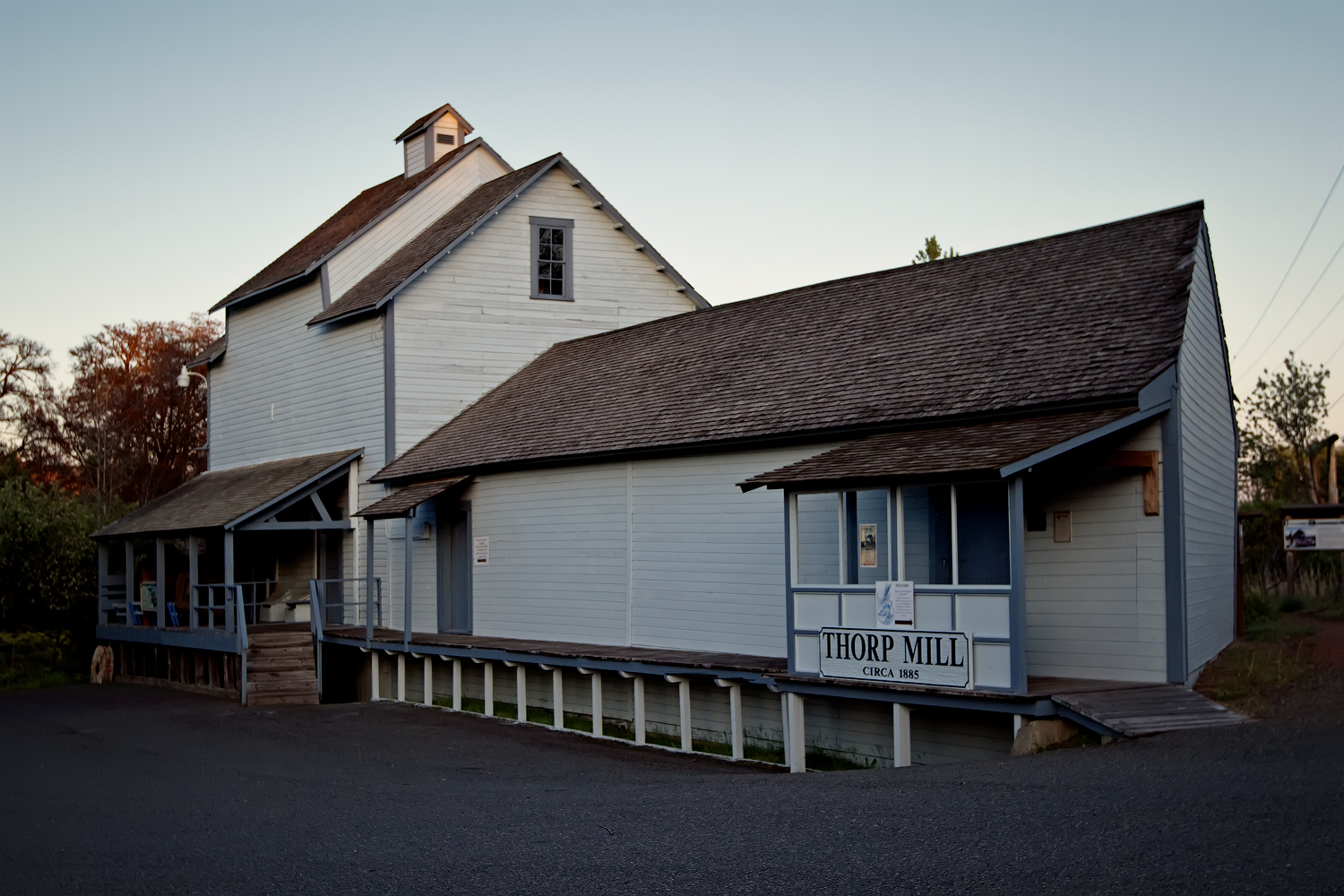
- Thorp Mill with millrace in foreground. (Photo 2011)

- Location within Washington (state)
- Location: Thorp, Washington
- Coordinates: 47.07428°N 120.68371°W
- Built: 1883
- Architect: Oren Hutchinson
- Architectural style: Banked Grist Mill
- NRHP reference No.: 77001343
- Designated NRHP: November 23, 1977

Thorp Mill is a historic building located in Thorp, Washington, United States.

On November 23, 1977, the Thorp Mill was placed on the National Register of Historic Places.

The landmark is maintained by the Thorp Mill Town Historical Preservation Society, which aims to preserve the mill for the benefit of the local community and to make it available for people seeking to understand American culture and history. To this end, the organisation now develops the mill site both as an interpretive site and as a gathering place for community activities, maintaining a sense of community in the town of Thorp's heritage, while keeping the same values of the community.

== History ==
See also, History of the Town of Thorp

In 1878, James L. Mills traversed the trail over the Cascade Mountains from Puget Sound by foot, and saw great possibilities in the Kittitas Valley. He built a sawmill west of the current town site in 1879, diverting water from the Yakima River to turn its wheels. The sawmill had a capacity of 7,000 feet daily.

Not content with the sawmill, Mills devised a way for the same wheels to power the North Star Mill, a gristmill that Oren Hutchinson had built at the town of Thorp in 1883, to provide feed for livestock and flour for the local residents. The four-story mill provided farmers throughout the Kittitas Valley with the convenience of local processing for wheat crops, as well as serving as an important hub for community activities. The North Star Mill was best known for its leading brand "Tip Top".

In 1907, the energy from the water wheel at the North Star Mill was utilized to power a steam generator having a 40-horsepower dynamo, which furnished electricity for laundering clothes two mornings each week, and for lighting homes for a few hours each evening. This gave Thorp the distinction of being among the first towns in Washington to have electricity, and the smallest unincorporated town in the Northwest to have electric lights.

The Thorp Mill continued active operation until its closure in 1946. On November 23, 1977, it was placed on the National Register of Historic Places.

== Operations ==
The mill utilized Yakima River water brought to the area through a system of canals. A horizontal water wheel powered both the gristmill and a nearby sawmill. An ice pond and log pond were located nearby, as well. The ice pond was used for recreational skating, and from it ice was harvested to chill the train cars that carried local fresh produce to market.

In the latter part of the 19th century, the nutritional content of flour ground with the wheat germ intact was a vast improvement over flour ground without the wheat germ, and contributed greatly to the health of settlers in developing communities. However, the presence of wheat germ also meant that the flour would spoil quickly, especially in the heat of summer. A local mill allowed area residents to process smaller quantities of wheat at a time. In addition, since the gristmill processed other grains for animal feed, locals were able to "fatten out" stock intended for market and to keep their working stock in better condition.

Kittitas Valley farmers brought their wheat crops to the Thorp Mill in wagons, and the grain was ground into flour, bran, or feed for livestock. Initially the grain was processed between huge stone burrs that had been brought laboriously via wagon from The Dalles, Oregon. In 1895, the arrival of the Northern Pacific Railroad depot enabled importation and installation of more efficient steel roller burrs. The railroad also provided local farmers with an easy means to sell their flour throughout the Puget Sound region.

== Thorp Mill Town Historical Preservation Society ==
The Thorp Gristmill stood unused for 40 years. Restoring it was thought it would be an expensive project, and there was little hope of obtaining the necessary funds until a request for community centennial projects raised the hopes of an enterprising group of people.

The Thorp Mill Town Historical Society began with a handful of Thorp High School alumni who decided to preserve the old gristmill located near the edge of town. Research revealed that although the local mill once was the center of every small community, nearly all such mills are gone now, destroyed by fire or dismantled during the Second World War.

Today, the organization is actively engaged in preservation projects focused on the Thorp Mill and the surrounding community of Thorp. The members maintain the mill as a landmark and museum, providing tours and interpretive information for visitors. In collaboration with Central Washington University, the society has engaged in the collection of historical records that are curated by the CWU Brooks Library, including historical photographs, documents and ephemera that provide a rich archive of historical and research materials. Each year, the Thorp Mill Town Historical Preservation Society produces events that raise funds to maintain the mill, and expand the offerings it provides to the local community.

In addition, the North Star Mill's combination of functions and its early production of electricity draw the interest of industrial historians nationwide.

== See also ==
- History of the Town of Thorp
- Thorp High School
- Kittitas County, Washington
- National Register of Historic Places listings in Kittitas County, Washington
