= Thorp High School =

Thorp High School may refer to:

- Thorp High School (Thorp, Washington)
- Thorp High School (Wisconsin)
