= Thorp Grade School =

- U.S. National Register of Historic Places
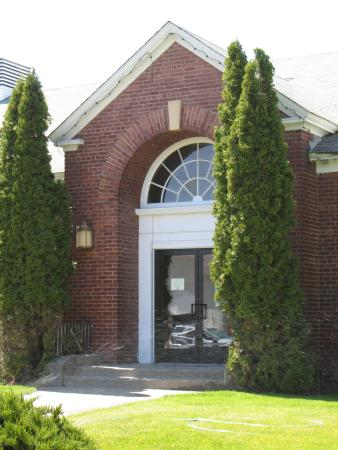
- Thorp Grade School (Photo 2010)

- Location within Washington (state)
- Location: Thorp, Washington
- Coordinates: 47.06911°N 120.67486°W
- Built: 1936
- Architect: John W. Maloney
- Architectural style: Colonial Revival
- NRHP reference No.: 09000541
- Designated NRHP: July 16, 2009

Thorp Grade School is a notable building located in Thorp, Washington, United States.

On July 16, 2009, it was placed on the National Register of Historic Places as a significant example of American rural education.

Built at a cost of $41,000 during the depths of the Great Depression using WPA funds, the building still stands and has been used continuously by Thorp School District No. 400 since its construction. A finely crafted red brick Colonial Revival structure, it was designed by the noted Northwest architect John W. Maloney.

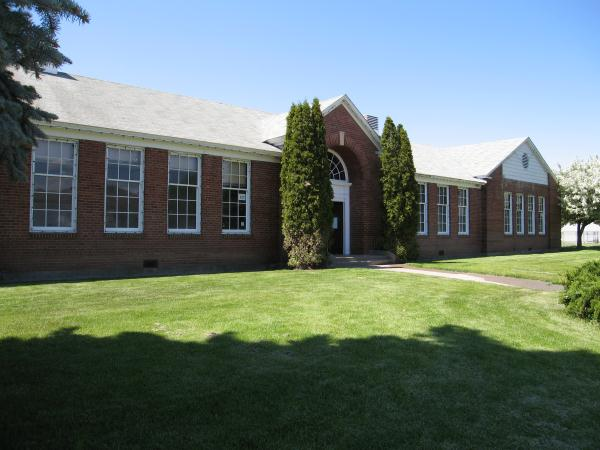
Thorp Grade School, north facade and main entrance.

== See also ==
- Thorp High School
- Kittitas County, Washington
- National Register of Historic Places listings in Kittitas County, Washington
