= Thorp, Washington =

Thorp, Washington (Native American Name: Klála)
- Census-designated place
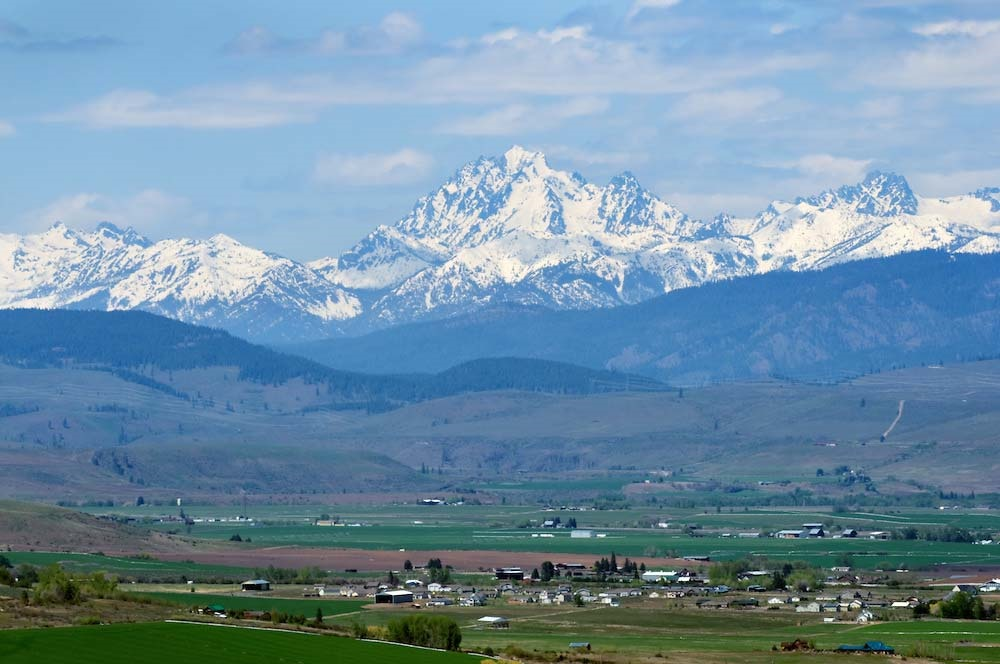
- View of Thorp with Mt. Stuart in distance.

- Location of Thorp, Washington

- Location in the United States
- Coordinates: 47°4′5″N 120°40′22″W
- Country: United States
- State: (Washington (state)) Washington
- County: Kittitas
- Settled: 1868
- Platted: July 9, 1895
- Named for: Fielden Mortimer Thorp

Area
  - Total: 1.2 sq mi (3.2 km^{2})
  - Land: 1.2 sq mi (3.2 km^{2})
  - Water: 0 sq mi (0.0 km^{2})
- Elevation: 1,637 ft (499 m)

Population (2020)
  - Total: 232
  - Density: 190/sq mi (73/km^{2})
  - Demonym: Thorpite; Thorpian
- Time zone: UTC-8 (Pacific (PST))
  - Summer (DST): UTC-7 (PDT)
- ZIP code: 98946
- Area code: 509
- FIPS code: 53-71225
- GNIS feature ID: 1527125

Thorp (/θɔːrp/ THORP) is an unincorporated community and census-designated place (CDP) in Kittitas County, Washington, United States. In 2020, the population was 232.

The town of Thorp is 100 miles (160 km) east of Seattle, 8 miles (13 km) northwest of Ellensburg, and 17 miles (27 km) southeast of Cle Elum. It is located at the narrow west end of the Kittitas Valley, where high elevation forests of the Cascade Range give way to cattle ranches surrounded by farmlands noted for timothy hay, alfalfa, vegetables, and fruit production.

Thorp is named for Fielden Mortimer Thorp, recognized as the first permanent white settler in the Kittitas Valley. He established a homestead at the approach to Taneum Canyon (/ˈteɪn.əm/, TAYN-əm) near the present-day town in 1868. Klála, an ancient Native American village and the largest indigenous settlement in the Kittitas Valley at the arrival of the first white settlers, was located about one mile above the current town site.

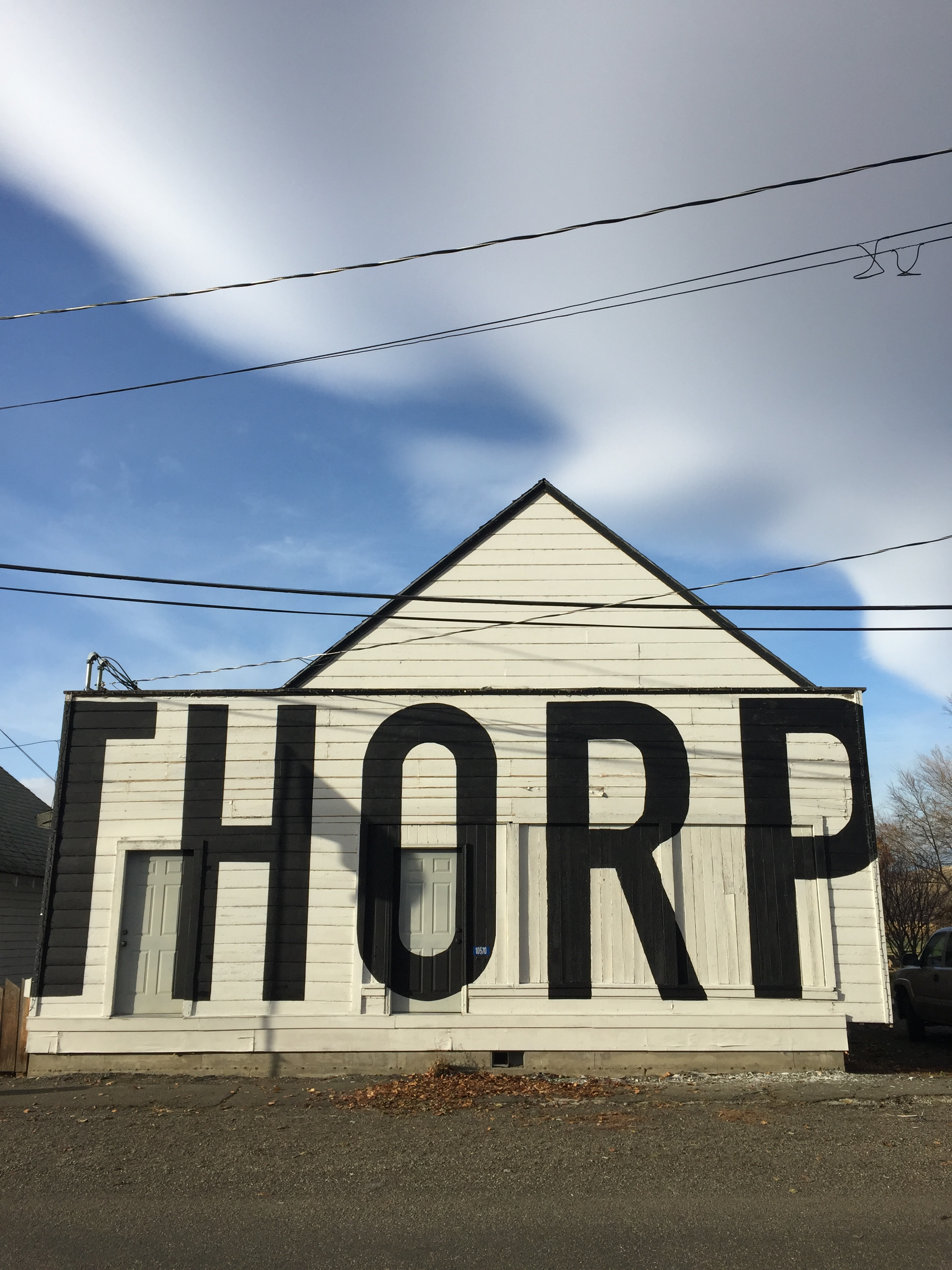
The Thorp Collective building

== Geography ==
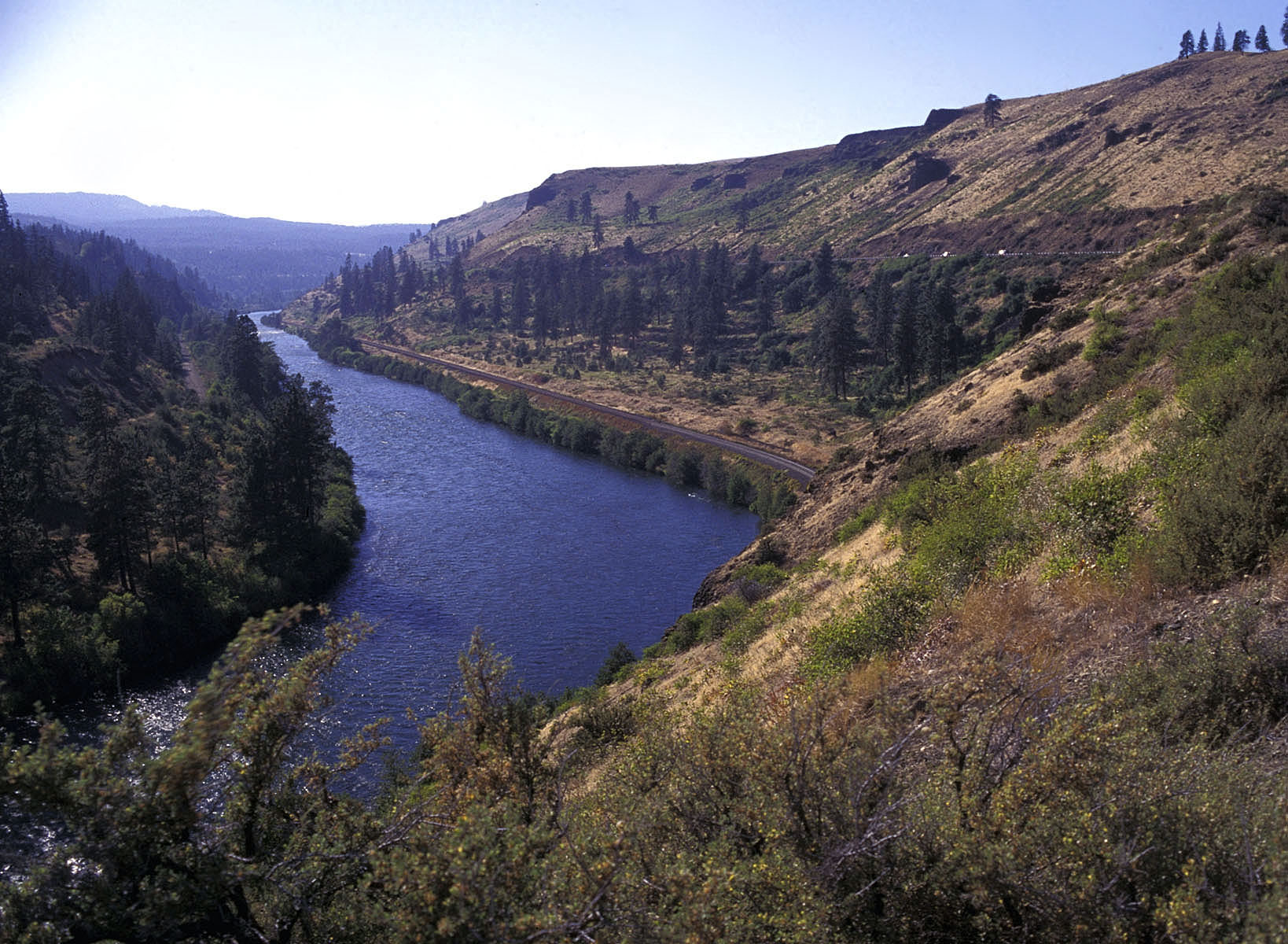
The Yakima River canyon near the town of Thorp.

Thorp is located in central Kittitas County at 47°4′5″N 120°40′22″W (47.068006, -120.672687). According to the United States Census Bureau, the CDP has a total area of 1.2 square miles (3.2 km^{2}), all of it land.

The town site of Thorp is above the flood plain of the upper Yakima River at an elevation of 1,637 feet (499 m). It is situated near the river's west bank directly opposite the Hayward Hill slide area and Clark Flats, near the southeastern approach to the Yakima River canyon at the foot of Thorp Prairie. To the west of the town is Taneum Canyon, and to the northwest are Elk Heights, Morrison Canyon and the Sunlight Waters private residential subdivision. Ellensburg, the county seat, is southeast of Thorp.

Northwest of Thorp at the junction of SR 10 and Thorp Highway, the Yakima River emerges from a canyon parallel to a basalt flow, the uppermost layers of which have been dated to 10.5 million years. The Thorp Prairie sits atop the basalt flows and ends at a deep canyon of Miocene columnar basalt structures carved by Swauk Creek whose headwaters are at Blewett Pass along US 97 to the north. The Thorp Prairie deposits were also delivered by the Thorp Glacial episode.

=== Topography ===
North and northeast of the town of Thorp along the Yakima River channel is the gradual upward lift of the Thorp Drift, marked by an elevation change due to the incline onto the terminal moraine that marks the furthest advance of the Thorp Glacial stage. Here the Thorp Gravels, which are named for the town of Thorp and the Thorp Glacial episode, are exposed along the ancient river channel in what is known as the "Slide Area". The gravels were formed at the terminus of the Thorp Glacial advance approximately 600,000 years ago.

The Thorp Gravels themselves are believed to be between 3 and 4 million years old. The whole structure is composed of individually layered belts of gravel and sand which are not well consolidated, continually weather, and are prone to continuing erosion and landslides averaging 30 degrees. The area is rich with wildlife, including bald eagles and osprey who hunt for prey along the river. It is also a crossing point for deer and elk who often can be seen at dawn and dusk heading to the river for water.

About 7 miles (11 km) west of Thorp, the first glimpses of the Columbia River Plateau are seen where the Yakima River has cut into the westernmost edge of the basalt plateau. The Columbia Plateau basalt formed when lava poured out of fissures in the ground across eastern Washington during the Miocene era, 17 to 20 million years ago, erupting intermittently for over 10 million years. Many layers of basalt successively flowed over one another, back when the area was still flat. Subsequent to the Miocene lava flows, the volcanoes of the Cascade Mountains actively erupted, depositing ash, cinders, pumice and mudflows that eventually inter-fingered with the alternating basalt layers throughout the region.

Thorp, Washington

Climate chart (precipitation, max. and min. temperature)
J	F	M	A	M	J	J	A	S	O	N	D
7.9 34 17	6.4 38 25	5.4 42 27	1 49 31	1.2 62 38	1.4 65 44	0.1 77 52	0.1 72 48	0.4 67 44	4.6 53 34	5.3 43 29	9.1 36 26
- █ Average max. and min. temperatures in °F
- █ Precipitation totals in inches
Metric conversion
J	F	M	A	M	J	J	A	S	O	N	D
202 1 −9	163 3 −4	137 6 −3	25 9 0	31 16 3	34 19 7	1.8 25 11	2.8 22 9	11 20 6	118 11 1	135 6 −2	230 2 −4
- █ Average max. and min. temperatures in °C
- █ Precipitation totals in mm

Interstate 90 drops through the Thorp Drift, which marks the oldest and furthest reaching known glacial moraine in the Kittitas Valley. Changes in the types of vegetation become more evident in this area. The changes are the result of a drop in elevation of about 1,400 feet from the summit of Snoqualmie Pass to Thorp, and a significant drop in precipitation of about 107 inches average a year at the summit of Snoqualmie Pass, to 42.94 inches average a year at Thorp.

At the bottom of the Thorp Drift moraine the view opens up into the Kittitas Valley which is deeply buried in river gravel deposited by the ancient Yakima River. This valley is a syncline that creates the Ellensburg Basin located between Mission Ridge to the north and Manastash Ridge to the south. The Ellensburg Basin, more formally called the Ellensburg Formation, holds nearly 4,000 feet of rock, sand, and gravel that accumulated over a period of 2 to 10 million years during the Miocene and lower Pliocene age.

=== Climate ===
The climate at Thorp is hot during summer when temperatures tend to be in the 80s, and very cold during winter when temperatures tend to be in the 20s.

The warmest month of the year at Thorp is July, with an average high of 77.2 °F and an average low of 51.8 °F. The coldest month of the year is January, with an average low of 16.5 °F and an average high of 34.3 °F. Temperature variations between night and day tend to be relatively large during summer with a difference that can reach 30 °F, and fairly limited during winter with temperatures hovering at or below freezing for most of the day, and often dipping below zero at night.

Temperatures generally drop significantly in October, while rainfall rises from less than half an inch to nearly 5 inches average per month. This trend continues through late autumn and winter, with a marked drop in precipitation beginning in April which coincides with a gradual rise in temperature into late spring and summer.

There is significant variation in rainfall throughout the year, with December and January receiving a mix of rainfall and snow, averaging 9.06 and 7.94 inches respectively. Rainfall during summer is, on average, less than half an inch each month with July receiving the lowest monthly average precipitation of the year at .07 inches.

== Demographics ==
Historical population
Census	Pop.	Note	%±
2000	273		—
2010	240		−12.1%
2020	232		−3.3%
U.S. Decennial Census; 1990 2000 2010

Thorp first appeared as a census designated place in the 2000 U.S. census.

=== Racial and ethnic composition ===
Thorp CDP, Washington – Racial and ethnic composition Note: the US Census treats Hispanic/Latino as an ethnic category. This table excludes Latinos from the racial categories and assigns them to a separate category. Hispanics/Latinos may be of any race.
Race / Ethnicity (NH = Non-Hispanic)	Pop 2000	Pop 2010	Pop 2020	% 2000	% 2010	% 2020
White alone (NH)	253	224	207	92.67%	93.33%	89.22%
Black or African American alone (NH)	0	1	0	0.00%	0.42%	0.00%
Native American or Alaska Native alone (NH)	3	3	0	1.10%	1.25%	0.00%
Asian alone (NH)	0	3	2	0.00%	1.25%	0.86%
Native Hawaiian or Pacific Islander alone (NH)	0	0	2	0.00%	0.00%	0.86%
Other race alone (NH)	1	0	2	0.37%	0.00%	0.86%
Mixed race or Multiracial (NH)	10	5	13	3.66%	2.08%	5.60%
Hispanic or Latino (any race)	6	4	6	2.20%	1.67%	2.59%
Total	273	240	232	100.00%	100.00%	100.00%

=== 2000 census ===
As of the census of 2000, there were 273 people, 103 households, and 74 families residing in the CDP. The population density was 221.2 people per square mile (85.7/km^{2}). There were 107 housing units at an average density of 86.7/sq mi (33.6/km^{2}). The racial makeup of the CDP was 93.41% White, 1.10% Native American, 1.83% from other races, and 3.66% from two or more races. Hispanic or Latino of any race were 2.20% of the population.

There were 103 households, out of which 44.7% had children under the age of 18 living with them, 56.3% were married couples living together, 14.6% had a female householder with no husband present, and 27.2% were non-families. 24.3% of all households were made up of individuals, and 6.8% had someone living alone who was 65 years of age or older. The average household size was 2.65 and the average family size was 3.17.

In the CDP, the population was spread out, with 33.0% under the age of 18, 4.8% from 18 to 24, 27.1% from 25 to 44, 26.0% from 45 to 64, and 9.2% who were 65 years of age or older. The median age was 36 years. For every 100 females, there were 113.3 males. For every 100 females age 18 and over, there were 96.8 males.

The median income for a household in the CDP was $33,125, and the median income for a family was $45,625. Males had a median income of $31,250 versus $22,500 for females. The per capita income for the CDP was $17,772. About 5.6% of families and 5.9% of the population were below the poverty line, including 5.2% of those under the age of eighteen and 19.2% of those 65 or over.

== History ==
Antoine & Lucy

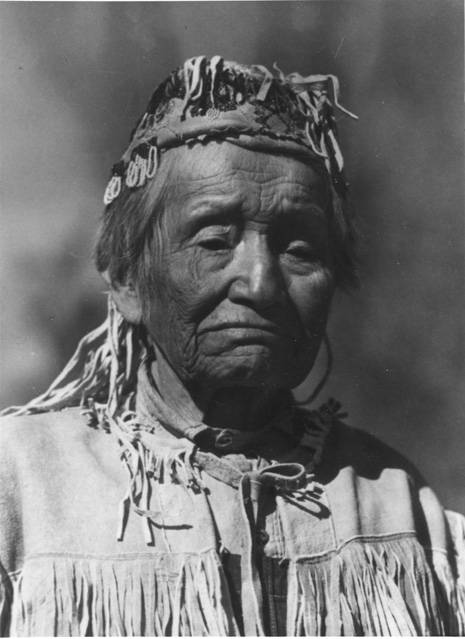
Antoine Bertram moved to the Thorp area with his friends Charles Splawn and F. M. Thorp. He is seen here wearing a buckskin jacket and beaded hat.

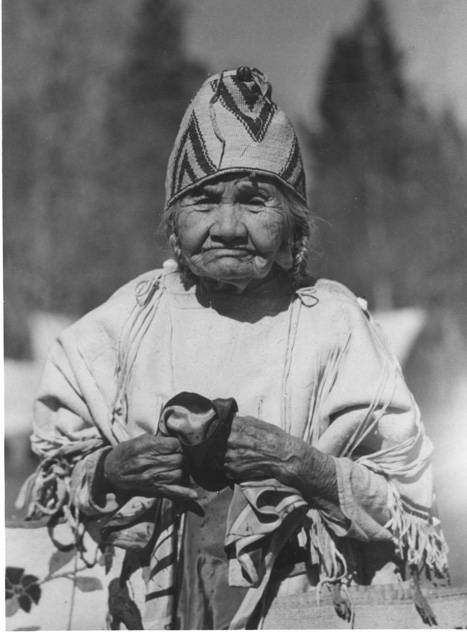
Lucy Pahofta Bertram was the daughter of Indian John. She lived in the Thorp area with her husband Antoine. She is seen here wearing traditional attire complete with intricate beadwork on her hat.

=== Native Americans ===
The Kittitas Valley was occupied by the Kittitas (Yakama Ichishkíin Sínwit: Ki-tatash) or Upper Yakama tribe, as well as hunting and food gathering parties of Cayuse and Nez Perce. The area was rich in wild berries, fish and game, and neighboring tribes annually converged on the valley in April or May to harvest Indian onions (Allium spp.), Indian potatoes (Claytonia lanceolata), and breadroot (Lomatium canbyi). The various tribes engaged in horse trading with early British and American fur traders, and had peaceful relations with Jesuit Catholic missionaries who preceded them.

In the 1840s, white settlers began to pour into the Oregon Territory (and later Washington Territory), bringing with them a measles epidemic and other diseases deadly to the indigenous population. That, coupled with cultural differences such as plowing the ground, which was seen as desecrating the spirit of the earth, led to confrontation between Native Americans and white settlers.

The largest indigenous settlement in the Kittitas Valley at the arrival of the white settlers was Klála, a village of around 500 people located about one mile above the present town of Thorp along the Yakima River opposite the mouth of Taneum Creek. Further up the river, about six miles northwest of present-day Thorp was the village of Tátxanixsha, and four miles below Thorp was a village of around 400 people called Yumi'sh.

Among the earliest records of Native American interaction with frontiersmen in the Kittitas Valley took place in 1858, the summer of the Yakima War, when a large contingency of Wanapum from Priest Rapids camped at the head of Taneum Canyon very close to where the town of Thorp is now located.

They were led by Smohalla, the legendary dreamer-prophet associated with the Washani or "Dreamer Movement" among the native peoples of the Pacific Northwest. Smohalla claimed that visions came to him through dreams, and he preached a return to the original way of life before white influences which included ritual music and dancing. His speaking was called Yuyunipitqana for “Shouting Mountain".

Rumors floated that Smohalla was preparing for battle. An exchange took place in which Rev. George W. Kennedy, a frontier Methodist preacher, traveled to the location of the camp in an attempt to make peace as he had become alarmed that such a large assembly meant hostility. By all accounts, Smohalla was not easily intimidated. "He looked like a king. Stolid as a statue," Kennedy said of meeting him. The preacher exhorted, "God had made us all brothers and not enemies" and "the Great Father want[s] us all to live together in peace on earth."

If that is true, Smohalla demanded, "Why has the white man taken our lands from us? Has the white man any rights here in [the] Kittitas that the Indian has any right to respect? The Indian came first."

It was, Kennedy conceded, "an unanswerable speech ... And I promised utmost friendship on the part of the white brothers. We gave them our hand shake and pronounced benediction of God on them, and Chief Smohalla agreed to accept that as the Pipe of Peace."

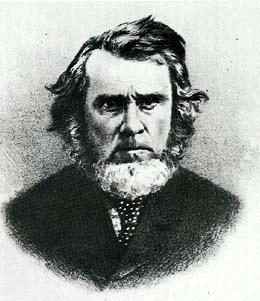
Thorp is named for Fielden Mortimer Thorp (1822-94), the first permanent white settler in the Kittitas Valley.

=== Thorp pioneers ===
Until the mid-1850s, the Kittitas Valley saw little encroachment by pioneer settlers. But in 1853, the first immigrant wagon trains passed through the area led by David Longmore. During that same year, George B. McClellan conducted a survey of the valley on behalf of the Northern Pacific Railroad, and two years later Charles Splawn briefly passed through the area.

Andrew Jackson Splawn, who traversed the valley in 1861 on his way to the nearby mines with his cattle, wrote of his experience:

"It was on the fourth day out that we came to the beautiful Kittitas valley. This valley, as it looked that day to me, a boy of 16, was the lovliest [sic] spot I had ever seen. To the west stood the great Cascade range; to the north rose the snow-capped peaks of the Peshastin to guard the beautiful valley below where the Yakima River wound its way full-length, while from the mountains on the north flowed numerous small streams and the whole plain was covered with a thick coat of grass."

Fielden Mortimer (F. M.) Thorp is recognized as the first white settler in the Yakima Valley, prior to his subsequent move to the pleasant surroundings of the present-day town of Thorp. Rudimentary county government was formed in Yakima County in 1865, and business was transacted at the home of F. M. Thorp near Moxee until another suitable location could be found.

Settlers began to trickle into the Kittitas Valley with the opening of the Snoqualmie Wagon Road in 1867, which approximated the modern-day route of Interstate 90 past Thorp, from Seattle to Ellensburg. Among these first adventurous individuals were F. M. Thorp and Charles Splawn, whose families had united with the marriage of Charles Splawn, a brother of Senator Andrew Jackson Splawn of Yakima, to Thorp's daughter Dulcena in 1863.

In 1868, they became the first permanent white settlers in the Kittitas Valley, building the Thorp and Splawn homesteads at the head of Taneum Canyon on the banks of Taneum Creek. This location, not more than a mile from the present town of Thorp, provided ideal shelter for their wintering cattle, as well as offering water and fertile soils for agriculture. Charles Splawn operated a tavern, or roadhouse, at this location which served as an overnight stop for travelers crossing the Snoqualmie Trail.

Shortly thereafter, the F. M. Thorp and Charles Splawn families were joined by their friend Walter J. Reed, the second settler in the Kittitas Valley, who later established the community of Cle Elum. Tillman Houser, another early settler who brought his family over Snoqualmie Pass to settle on Coleman Creek, entered the valley on June 16 of that same year, and was later joined by Martin Dervan and his wife. The first post office in the Kittitas Valley was established as Taneum Station at the home of F. M. Thorp in 1869.

Antoine Bertram was a Yakama Indian who moved to the Thorp area with the Charles Splawn and the F. M. Thorp families. He farmed the area with his first wife Emma Pahofta, the daughter of Indian John (for whom Indian John Hill, and the Indian John Hill Rest Area on Interstate 90 between Cle Elum and Thorp are named). Later in life he married Emma's sister Lucy Pahofta. Antoine helped Thorp and Splawn tend their cattle. Keneho, another friendly Indian of Yakama descent, was paid ten dollars by Charles Splawn for each trip to carry the mail over the Snoqualmie Trail to and from the Taneum Station post office.

Among the mysterious landmarks in the Thorp area is stone slab marking a grave at Tamarack Springs in the Taneum Canyon, which reads, "A White Woman's Grave." This grave belongs to the wife of Al Williams, whose wife was killed at the springs in 1870. Williams and his wife were traveling through the area and became lost. They were directed by an Indian to follow the Tamarack Trail, since it was the closest route to a settlement. In hurrying to their destination, the woman's horse stumbled over a log and fell. A letter written by Charles Splawn explains the tragic events:

"Because his wife was expecting a baby, they started to go to a settlement. The horse Mrs. Williams was riding fell while jumping a log. The child was born prematurely and the mother and baby died. Williams buried his wife and child as best he could. And rode down into the valley. He afterwards came back to remove the bodies. Thorp, Splawn and Rego advised him not to. They told him she was a pioneer's daughter and a pioneer's wife and she should rest in a pioneer grave."

Years later, according to the late Mrs. W. D. Bruton of Thorp, a marker was placed over the grave by Matt Pointer, who rode the area with his cattle, to mark it as a white woman's grave so it would not be vandalized. Eventually, a fence was built around it and rocks placed over it to protect it from livestock. After the death of his wife, Williams went to the Puget Sound area and operated a ferry at Nisqually River and eventually moved to California where his brother owned a stage line. Today, the grave is located off Road 3120 on land owned by the Washington Department of Natural Resources in a small fenced area across a meadow from the springs.

The Thorp-Splawn Pioneer Cemetery is located about a mile southwest of the town of Thorp on the north side of Interstate 90 in a field that is visible from the freeway. The Thorp-Splawn Cemetery was neglected until 1964, when the Terra Firma Garden Club of Thorp restored the plot. However, putting the markers over the right graves was impossible due to years of decay and it is uncertain whether the markers correctly correspond with the individuals buried there.

Other early settlers in the Thorp area were Herman Page, J. H. Stevens, W. D. Killmore, A. T. Mason, George O’Hare, George and Jacob Forgey, John Newman, and John C. Goodwin. Goodwin was later appointed the first sheriff of Kittitas County upon the first meeting of the county commissioners in Ellensburg on December 17, 1883. John Ellison and Amy Childs of Thorp were both members of early settler families in the area, and at the time of their marriage in 1884, received the first marriage license granted in Kittitas County.

- Thorp Mill
- U.S. National Register of Historic Places
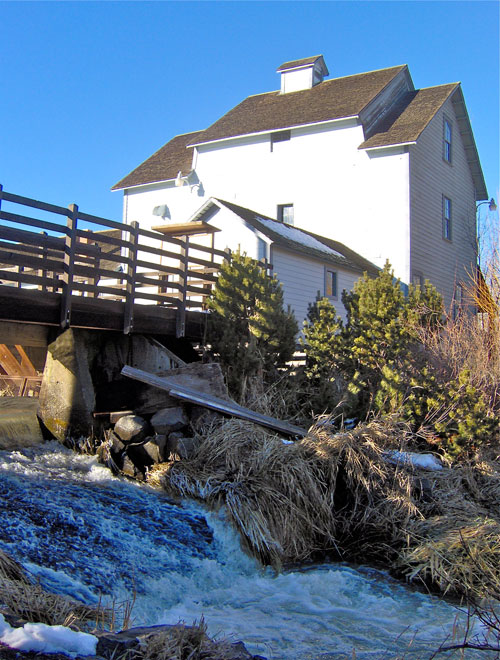
- Historic Thorp Mill

- Location within Washington (state)
- Location: Thorp, Washington
- Built: 1883
- Architect: Oren Hutchinson
- Architectural style: Banked Grist Mill
- NRHP reference No.: 77001343
- Designated NRHP: November 23, 1977

In the 1870s, the area that would become Thorp was known as Pleasant Grove and was part of Yakima County. On July 6, 1872, the Pleasant Grove post office on the west side of the Yakima River was established at the ranch of John S. Vaughn, and the Taneum post office was discontinued the following year on April 7 due to an unnecessary overlap in service. Despite being one of the earliest locations in Kittitas County to be settled, Pleasant Grove would remain sparsely populated for the next decade, with cattle ranching as the primary occupation.

By the early 1880s, farming was beginning to take hold in the area around Thorp, and the open range began to shrink. In 1880, the Pleasant Grove post office was moved close to where the small commercial center was beginning to form with the establishment of a sawmill and, three years later, a gristmill. The new settlement hoped for the eventual establishment of a railway depot as the Northern Pacific Railroad had made its intentions clear that it would soon come through the valley close to where the village was located.

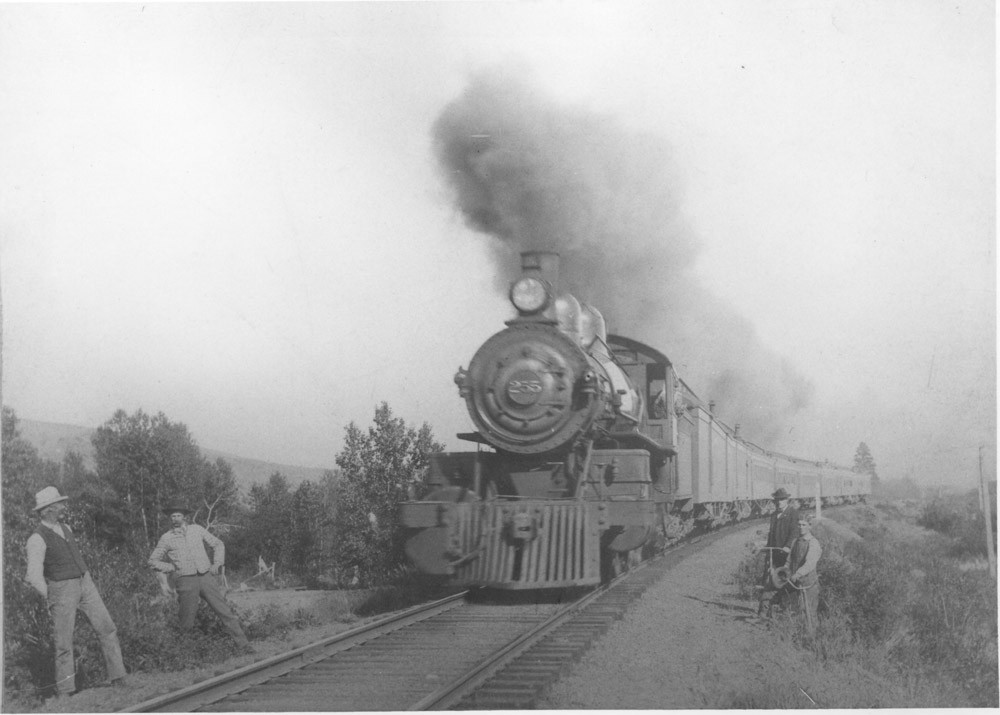
Train No. 255 of the Northern Pacific as it approaches Thorp. (Photo ca. 1900)

=== Mill town and railroad era ===
In 1878, James L. Mills traversed the trail over the Cascade Mountains from Puget Sound by foot, and saw great possibilities in the Kittitas Valley. He built a sawmill west of the current town site in 1879, diverting water from the Yakima River to turn its wheels. The sawmill had a capacity of 7,000 feet daily.

Not content with the sawmill, Mills devised a way for the same wheels to power the North Star Mill, a gristmill that Oren Hutchinson had built at the town of Thorp in 1883, to provide feed for livestock and flour for the local residents. The mill was best known for its leading brand "Tip Top".

The Pleasant Grove post office was moved in 1880 to a site near the mills and changed its name to Milton post office to reflect the name of the small settlement that had sprung up at that location, which was named for Milton Young. It was housed in several farm houses northwest of the current town site of Thorp until 1884, when it was re-established at the Thorp gristmill through the instrumentality of James L. Mills, who named it "Oren" after Oren Hutchinson. In 1889, the name of the post office was changed to "Thorp" to conform with the name used for the settlement by the Northern Pacific Railroad, and, in 1895, the post office was moved just down the road to the location of the depot that was built there and the town site that had been platted around it.

It was the system of water delivery that made the mills at Thorp possible, and the farming lands around Thorp are the oldest irrigated section in Kittitas County. The Manastash Canal was completed in 1875, followed later in the same year by the Taneum Ditch Company. The Westside irrigating canal that runs just south of the town of Thorp was begun in June 1889, and water was first used in 1890. Utilizing water diverted from the Yakima River, it is about 14 miles long and averages 12 feet wide. The original cost for building the Westside Canal was $30,000.

To a great extent, the town of Thorp owes its existence to the arrival of the Northern Pacific Railroad. While some of the initial settlement was undoubtedly influenced by the convergence of wagon trails which would eventually cross Snoqualmie Pass, it was the location of the Cascade spur that ultimately determined the location of the town. In 1887, the Northern Pacific Railroad reached the town of Thorp, when the railroad’s management built a sidetrack out one mile west of the current town site and named it after the intrepid pioneer F. M. Thorp and his family.

It took two years to build the Northern Pacific line from Old Town, now Union Gap, to Thorp. Chinese laborers or "coolies" were brought in first to build the Northern Pacific spur, and again to extend the Milwaukee Road through the Kittitas Valley. A Northern Pacific section house was located at Thorp where men of the regular crew boarded, while Chinese laborers and other members of the work gang had their own sleeping cars.

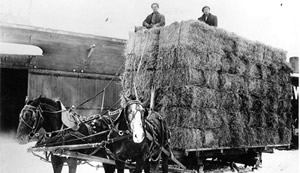
Horse drawn wagon loaded with hay near Thorp. (Photo ca. 1900)

In 1895, with the extension of the main line to the site of the current town, the railroad station was moved and the town was laid out. The town of Thorp developed around this depot, with the first developments including the construction of maintenance facilities, shipping facilities and warehouses.

The current town site was settled by the Newman family in 1878. On July 9, 1895, a three-block town site was platted around the site of the Northern Pacific depot by John M. and Sarah Isabel Newman. In May 1900, Milford A. Thorp, a son of F. M. Thorp, added Thorp's Addition, incorporating into the town site the land he had purchased in 1885 from James McMurray. Houses and businesses quickly sprang up, and small farms appeared around the edges.

The first store in Thorp was opened by J. E. Veach in about 1895. The first hotel was the Thorp House, established by A. St. John in 1893. The hotel was superseded by the Tanum House [sic] in 1903, which was built and operated by J. F. Duncan.

The Ellensburg Dawn newspaper wrote in the spring of 1901 of the promising little town:

"The little village of Thorp, nine miles up the road, is one of the nicest little places in Central Washington. It is quiet, no saloons to mar the pleasure of the inhabitants, has a good church, a good public school building, a sawmill and a good flouring mill, both of which are operated by water power, a manufacturing establishment--land roller and box factory, and in fact you can get about all the accommodations in Thorp you can get in many towns of much larger population. We are glad Thorp is in Kittitas County."

In 1907, the energy from the water wheel at the North Star Mill was utilized to power a steam generator having a 40-horsepower dynamo, which furnished electricity for laundering clothes two mornings each week, and for lighting homes for a few hours each evening. This gave Thorp the distinction of being among the first towns in Washington to have electricity, and the smallest unincorporated town in the Northwest to have electric lights.

The addition of a Milwaukee Road depot in 1909 meant that Thorp was the first rail stop where the Chicago, Milwaukee, St. Paul & Pacific Railroad and the Northern Pacific Railroad crossed paths, making it an important shipping point at one time. The Chicago, Milwaukee, St. Paul & Pacific Railroad operated its headquarters for building operations in the Lower Kittitas County, including the shipping in of supplies for the area, out of its Thorp depot. The pay office of employees and the commissary were also located at Thorp.

The U.S. Postal Service carried mail to and from Thorp by railroad cars of the Northern Pacific. Rather than stopping and losing precious time, RPO (railway post office) cars featured a large hook that would catch the mailbag in its crook on the way past the station. A daily passenger train ran east to Ellensburg and points beyond, stopping in Thorp around 11:30 a.m. and returning around 4 p.m., followed by another westbound train at 11 p.m.

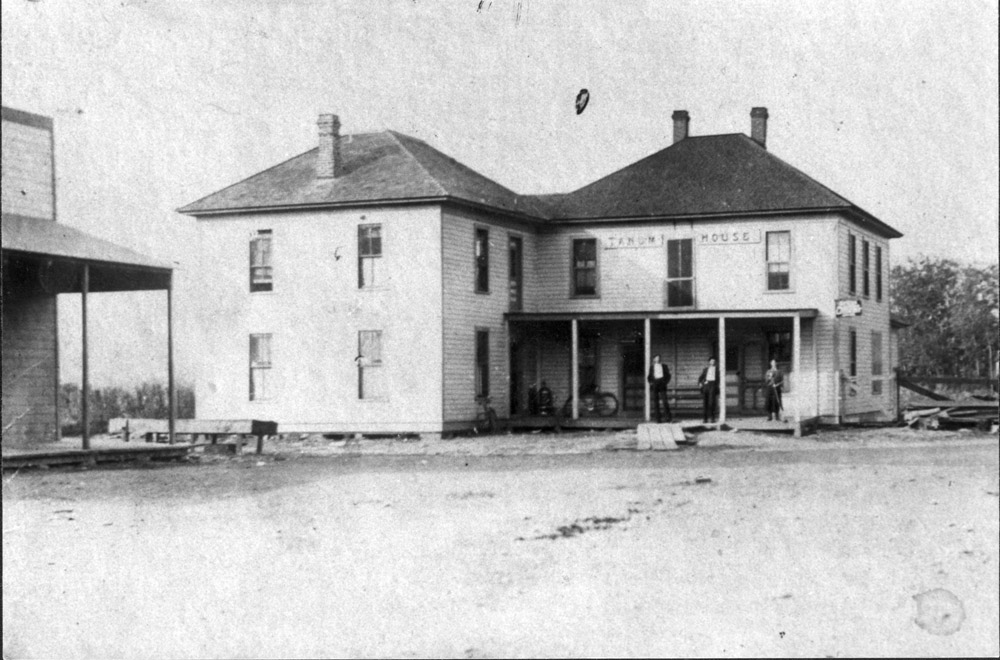
The Tanum House hotel, later renamed Thorp Hotel, was destroyed by fire in 1938. (Photo ca. 1915)

Commercial Buildings
in Thorp

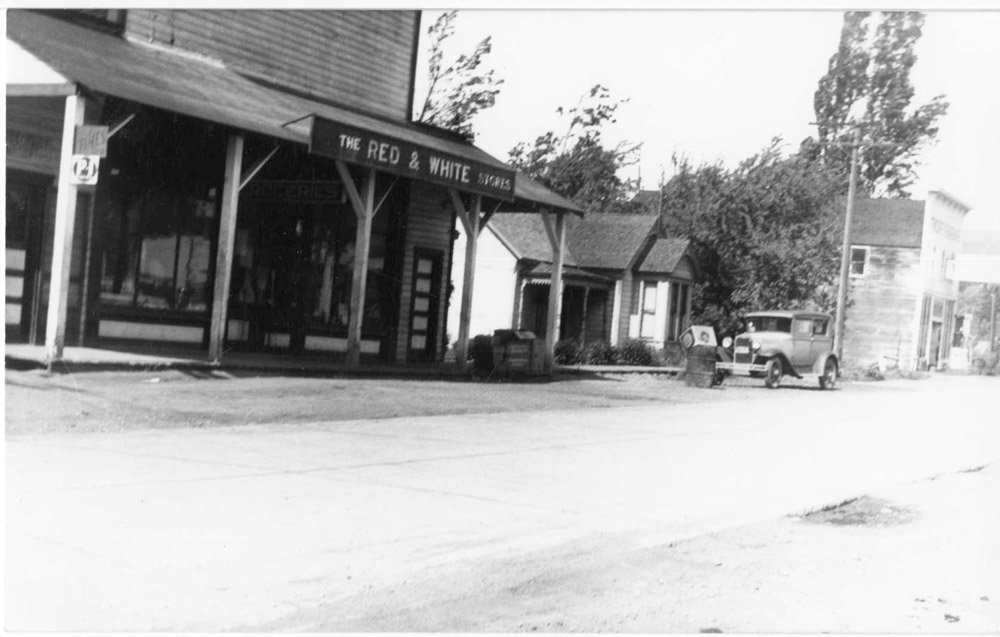
Red & White Store (Photo ca. 1930)

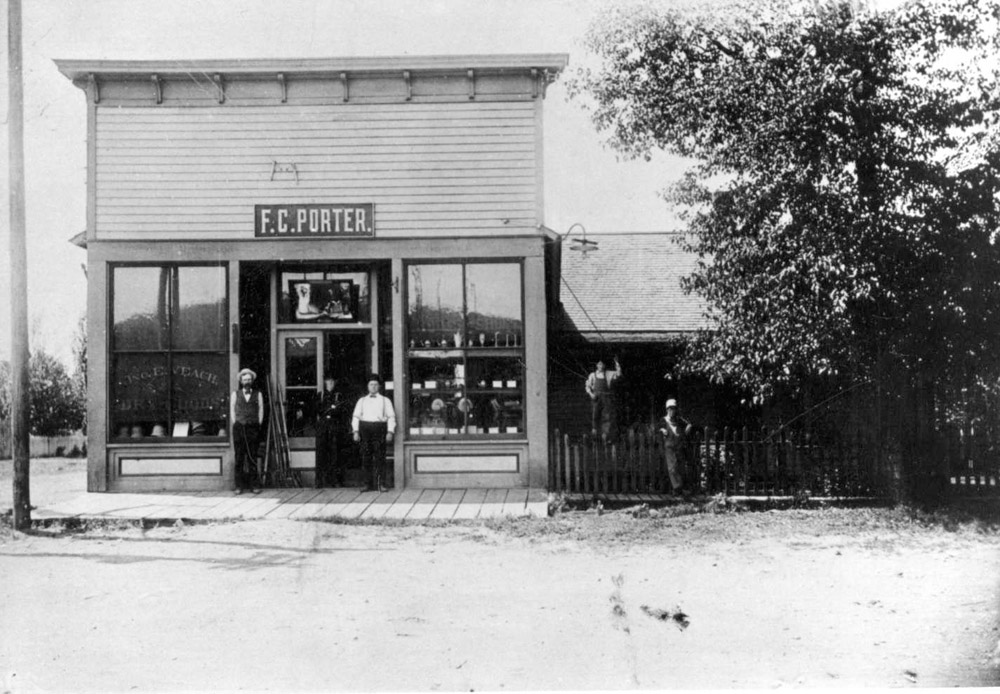
F. C. Porter Dry Goods (Photo ca. 1915)

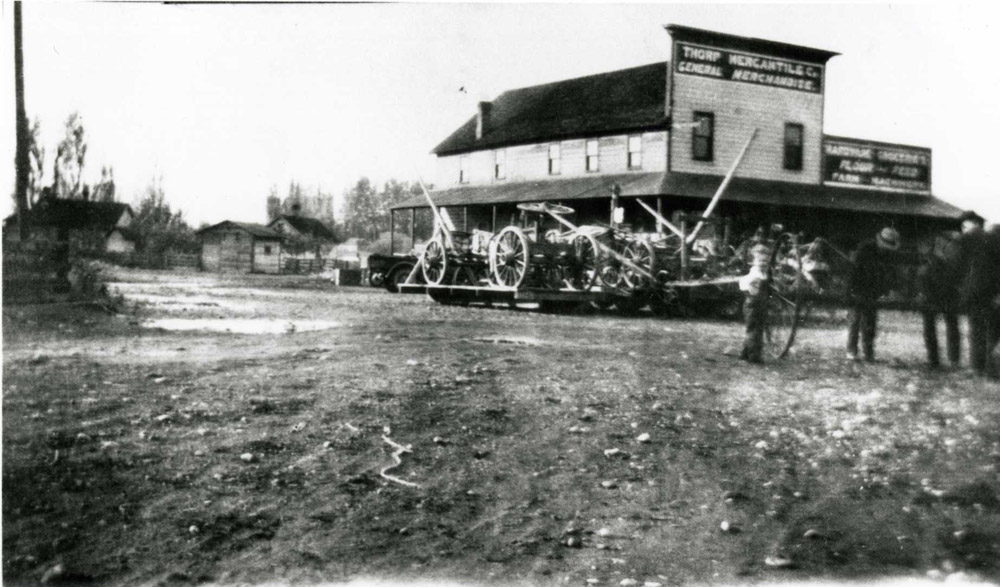
Thorp Mercantile Company & General Store. (Photo ca. 1915)

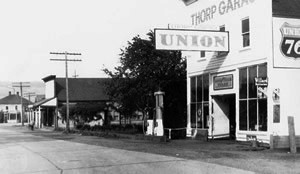
Thorp Garage with Thorp Hotel (formerly Tanum House) in distance. (Photo ca. 1935)

=== Boomtown and beyond ===
Through the first few decades of the 20th century, the town's economy remained steady with the population reaching its peak at around 400 people. Eugene B. Brain wrote of the flourishing town of Thorp, as it was poised to enter into its boomtown era, in The Coast magazine:

"The people of Thorp are prosperous and well-to-do. The business interests are represented by two general stores, a fine hotel, drug store, restaurant, livery, meat market, blacksmith shop, saw mill, flouring mill, numerous fruit packers and shippers and other pursuits [...] with a bright present, a prosperous and large future lies before the town. Thorp is bound to grow and with its enterprising and progressive residents a magnificent town is assured--a town of wealth and importance for Kittitas County."

Then in the late 1920s and 1930s, Thorp experienced a remarkable economic boost despite the Great Depression that had descended upon the nation.

This period of growth and prosperity was led by an influx of timber workers from the Taneum Canyon, where the Cascade Logging Company maintained a portable logging camp. In 1928, Thorp became one of the headquarters for the Bureau of Reclamation's Kittitas Division of the Yakima Project which focused on construction of the Highline Canal, an event that brought yet more activity to the town.

This coincided with the establishment of Camp Taneum as Company 4771 of the Civilian Conservation Corps at nearby Taneum Canyon, bringing as many as 189 young men from as far away as New York to work at the camp, many of whom frequented the town of Thorp for shopping and entertainment. Camp Taneum was disbanded in July 1938, and its enrollees transferred to Fort Snelling, Minnesota, Fort Leavenworth, Kansas, and Little Rock, Arkansas for reassignment.

The boost in the economy brought workers into the town, spawning the need for social venues which, with the absence of liquor during the Prohibition era, made Ellison's Hall a great attraction. Located at the corner of Railroad Street (Thorp Highway) and First Street, Ellison's offered lively smokers on Saturday nights. It was also the home of many parties hosted by the Ladies' Aid Society, and dances featuring local favorites like "Larry's Harmony Aces" and "Pinky's Roamers".

On the morning of May 24, 1938, a serious fire burned several small businesses to the ground, including the Thorp Hotel, and a mercantile along with the clubhouse on the second floor above it which was home to the Thorp Odd Fellows and Rebekahs lodges.

The Thorp Hotel had been operated as the "Tanum House" [sic] first by J. F. Duncan and then by Frank and Callie Mattox. The name was changed sometime in the 1920s, and subsequently operated by Harrison and Nancy Barrett from 1924 to 1930. At the time of the fire it was operated by Ray Long.

None of the businesses destroyed in the 1938 fire were rebuilt, and the business district of the town was again struck by fire on the afternoon of August 16, 1943, when another commercial building was burned. The blaze threatened a serious conflagration, and was extinguished by state forestry crews with the assistance of a pumper from Ellensburg.

The realization that the fire might have been more serious, coupled with the previous fires in the town, gave impetus to a movement that had been underway at Thorp for some time regarding the purchase of fire equipment. An emergency meeting of the town residents was held on the evening of August 19, 1943, to discuss the town's response to the problem. Kittitas County Fire District No. 1 was organized in that same year at Thorp, and is the oldest fire protection district in the state. The volunteer fire department's small fire house was topped with the large bell that originally hung in the belfry of the old Thorp school house. The bell is now an artifact at the current fire station which was recently built adjacent to the old one. The original fire house was subsequently sold and has been converted to an artist's studio and residence.

The boomtown days began to subside with the departure of the canal workers and the winding down of nearby logging operations. The local economy greatly suffered with many businesses closing never to reopen, and the boom era had essentially come to a close by the end of World War II.

The Northern Pacific Railroad depot at Thorp was officially closed on July 1, 1952. The Northern Pacific cited a steady decline in shipments and competition from trucks as the reason for the closure. The last shipment of freight moved from Thorp via the Northern Pacific line was on May 9, 1952.

In 1967, ground was broken at the site of the 1938 fire by the Ellensburg Telephone Company which acquired the land to build a local telephone exchange office for the Thorp area. The building, which cost $25,000 to complete, was cut into service in May 1968, and is still in use. The exchange office was originally equipped to handle 400 subscribers.

The construction of a two-lane steel truss bridge over the Yakima River west of Thorp in 1936, prepared the way for the designation of the Thorp Highway, from State Route 10 (SR 10) to US 97, as SSH 3M (Secondary State Highway 3M) in 1937. In 1953, the highway through Thorp was deleted from the state highway system.

The location of U.S. Route 10 (now State Route 10) north of Thorp in 1926, and the eventual opening of Interstate 90 in 1968, all played vital roles in the changing population and economic conditions that shaped the small community.

In 1980, Interstate 90 from Seattle to Thorp was designated the Mountains to Sound Greenway to protect its outstanding scenic and cultural resources.

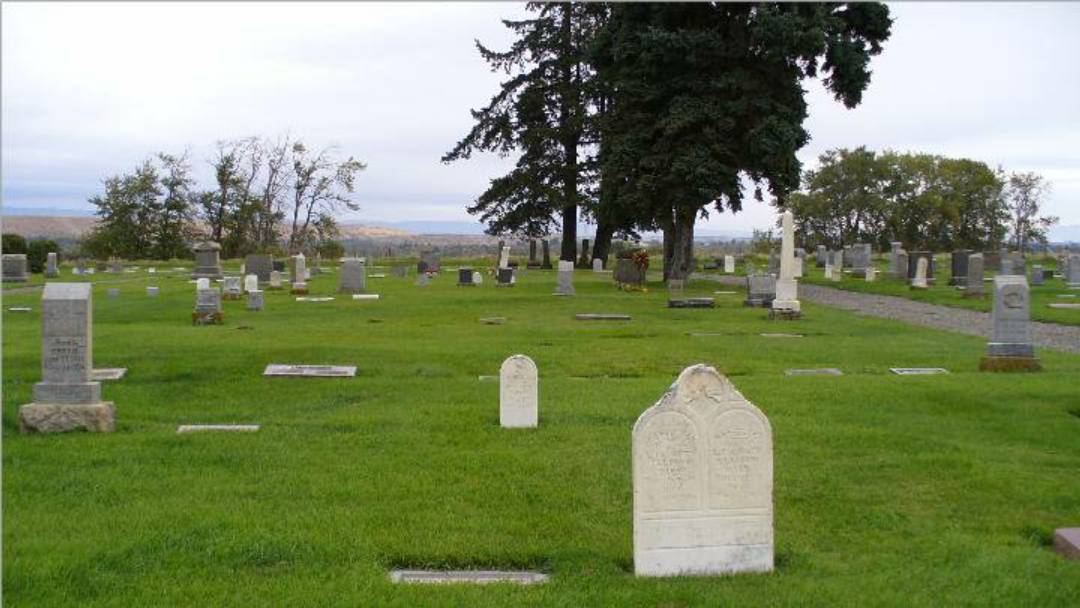
Thorp Cemetery is said to be haunted by the ghost of a young Indian woman who met a tragic death around the year 1890.

=== Thorp Cemetery ===
The Thorp Cemetery is located about a mile south of the town along Thorp Cemetery Road. Herman Page, a farmer who came to Thorp from New York, gave land for the cemetery and he is buried there. Markers denote graves dated as early as 1890, however Herman Page started Page's Grove, a 10-acre timber culture, and claimed his 160-acre homestead as early as 1875.

The title was transferred to the Thorp Methodist Episcopal Church in the late 1880s, and it was subsequently operated by the Thorp Odd Fellows Lodge until 1940 when the lodge folded. In 1962, it was placed under the management of Kittitas County Cemetery District No. 1.

Local legend holds that the cemetery is haunted by the ghost of a young Indian woman by the name of Susie, who was tragically lynched around the year 1890 at Thorp, by persons unknown in the area. Documents held by the Kittitas County Genealogical Society confirm her death as "caused by hanging by unknown person," listing her father as Salmon La Sac. It is reported that she has been seen riding a white horse, and weeping sorrowfully among the tombstones on moonlit nights. The cemetery is often listed among "haunted places" in Washington state.

The cemetery is well cared for, and remains an active place of burial for departed loved ones of the Thorp community. Visitors, especially those fascinated by the legends surrounding the cemetery, are encouraged to show respect for those resting there, and for the rights and privacy of visiting families.

Thorp Church of Christ
Charter Roll of 1895
Myra Barnett, Robert Barnett, Retta Barnett, Eldora Briggs, William Briggs, Lena Burns, Frances Childs, Mary Childs, Hannah Childs, Warren Childs, George DeShazer, Nancy DeShazer, Allie Ellison, Eugene Ellison, Maud Ellison, Ruth Ellison, John Ellison, Lewis Ellison, Deborah George, Ellis George, Dee Goodwin, Lillian Goodwin, Olive Goodwin, Martha Mattox, William Mattox, Jennie Osborn, Florence Snyder, Dora Stultz, Philip Stultz and Laura Turner.

=== Churches ===
Several Thorp families that came from Polk County, Oregon, had a heritage in the Stone-Campbell Movement. Although they had been meeting as a group since 1890, the Thorp Church of Christ was not formed until 1895. The primary movers in launching the new congregation were Mary Childs and Sarah Goodwin. Their work was successful, but Sarah Goodwin is not listed on the charter roll of 1895 because she had already passed to her eternal reward by the time the church was fully established.

The first services were held at the Thorp school house, with a permanent church structure being erected in 1897. Early ministers signed one-year contracts to serve the community with most moving on to other congregations after only a short period of time.

The town of Thorp was also the home of the Thorp Methodist Episcopal Church for many years, however that congregation was disbanded sometime in the 1930s. The steeple on the Methodist Episcopal church was cut off, and it served variously as a Grange hall, clubhouse and the Rodeo Renegades square dance hall.

In 1949, Teddy Leavitt formed a short-lived Bible college at Thorp, which was affiliated with the Thorp Church of Christ. The church structure fell victim to fire on April 13, 1950, and as a result the college was relocated to Selah, Washington, where it continued as the Central Washington Bible College until 1977. After the 1950 blaze, the Thorp Church of Christ was quickly rebuilt in the same location.

The Thorp Church of Christ became the Thorp Community Church in 1981. It is located near the intersection of Goodwin Road and First Street in Thorp, and continues to minister to the spiritual needs of the townspeople.

== Transportation ==
Reachable via Exit 101 (Thorp, Thorp Highway) on Interstate 90, Thorp can also be accessed from State Route 10 (formerly U.S. Route 10) via the Thorp Highway at milepost 8.98.

The main line of the Northern Pacific Railroad used to run through the town of Thorp, and it was considered an important shipping point at one time. Currently the Burlington Northern-Santa Fe uses the rail line through the town, but the train no longer makes stops.

== Education ==
- Thorp Grade School
- U.S. National Register of Historic Places
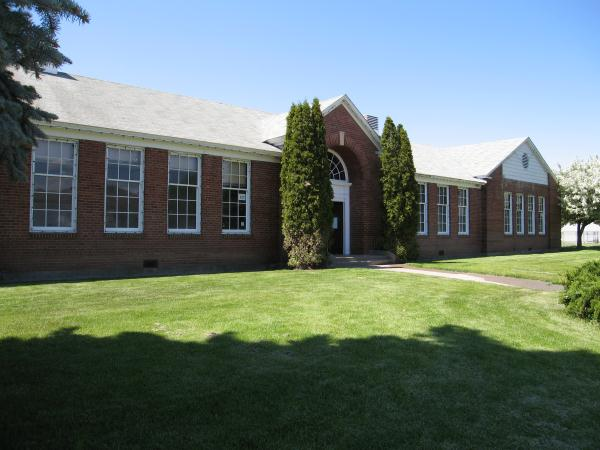
- Thorp Grade School (Photo 2009)

- Location within Washington (state)
- Location: Thorp, Washington
- Built: 1936
- Architect: John W. Maloney
- Architectural style: Colonial Revival
- NRHP reference No.: 09000541
- Designated NRHP: July 16, 2009

Public schools are operated by Thorp School District No. 400. The district includes one junior/senior high school (Thorp High School), and one elementary school.

== Points of interest ==
- Thorp Community Day -- Thorp Community Day is an annual celebration taking place in early October, coinciding with the autumn harvest. The event begins with a pancake breakfast at the Thorp Fire Station, and a parade through the town. It culminates with various community-oriented activities including the Fall Market at the Thorp Tractor Company, which generally attracts local vendors featuring anything from handcrafted furniture, clothing, jewelry, art, antiques and fresh local produce. The Harvest Carnival, held at the historic Thorp Grade School building, offers old-fashioned games such as apple bobbing, the ring toss and pumpkin bowling. Proceeds from carnival ticket sales go to support student activities at Thorp High School. An open house at the historic Thorp Mill is also a highlight of the celebration, which also includes live entertainment from local musicians.
- Iron Horse State Park - Part of the Washington State Park System, Iron Horse State Park follows the path of the now defunct Milwaukee Road between the Cascade Mountains and Yakima River Valley, between Cedar Falls on the west and the Columbia River on the east. Access is on Thorp Depot Road near Interstate 90 exit 101 at Thorp.
- The Thorp Mill - One of Kittitas County's oldest landmarks, the historic grist mill is listed on the National Register of Historic Places and offers a unique perspective on the history of Thorp and the surrounding area.
- Thorp Grade School - Listed on the National Register of Historic Places, the building was erected in 1936 and continues to serve the educational needs of the children of the town of Thorp. During hours of operation, visitors can check in at the district administrative offices in the modern building next door. A look inside the old school house reveals finely crafted hardwood floors, intact mouldings and a wood paneled gymnasium.
- Northern Pacific Depot - The Northern Pacific train depot was originally located adjacent to the railroad tracks near the corner of Thorp Highway and Second Streets. It was subsequently moved to its current location along Thorp Highway near the east entrance to the town.
- Old Thorp Fire Station - Fire District No. 1 was established in 1943, and is the oldest fire protection district in the state. The old fire station is located near the corner of Main Street and Thorp Highway adjacent to the new fire station. The building was recently sold and converted to a residence.
- Old Thorp Post Office - Located near the corner of Main Street on the Thorp Highway, closeby the old fire station, the old Thorp Post Office operated until the 1990s when a new structure was built a few blocks away. The old post office is now an artist studio called Thorp Collective.
- F. C. Porter Store - A start-of-the-20th century dry goods store on the corner of Thorp Highway and Second Streets, this building now houses a printing business. One of the oldest surviving commercial structures in the area, it originally opened around 1895 as J. E. Veach Dry Goods and was the first store established at Thorp. It was subsequently acquired by the Porter family, who expanded the building around 1912 to include integrated living quarters in the back, which was common in small-town businesses of the era. It is a classic example of late 19th-century false-front commercial wood-frame architecture.

== Notable people ==
- Margaret Leonard, state legislator

== See also ==
- Thorp High School
- Thorp Mill - Listed on the National Register of Historic Places
- Thorp Grade School - Listed on the National Register of Historic Places
- Thorp Mill Town Historical Preservation Society
- National Register of Historic Places listings in Kittitas County, Washington
