= South Cle Elum Yard =

- Chicago, Milwaukee, St. Paul and Pacific Railroad: South Cle Elum Yard
- U.S. National Register of Historic Places
- U.S. Historic district
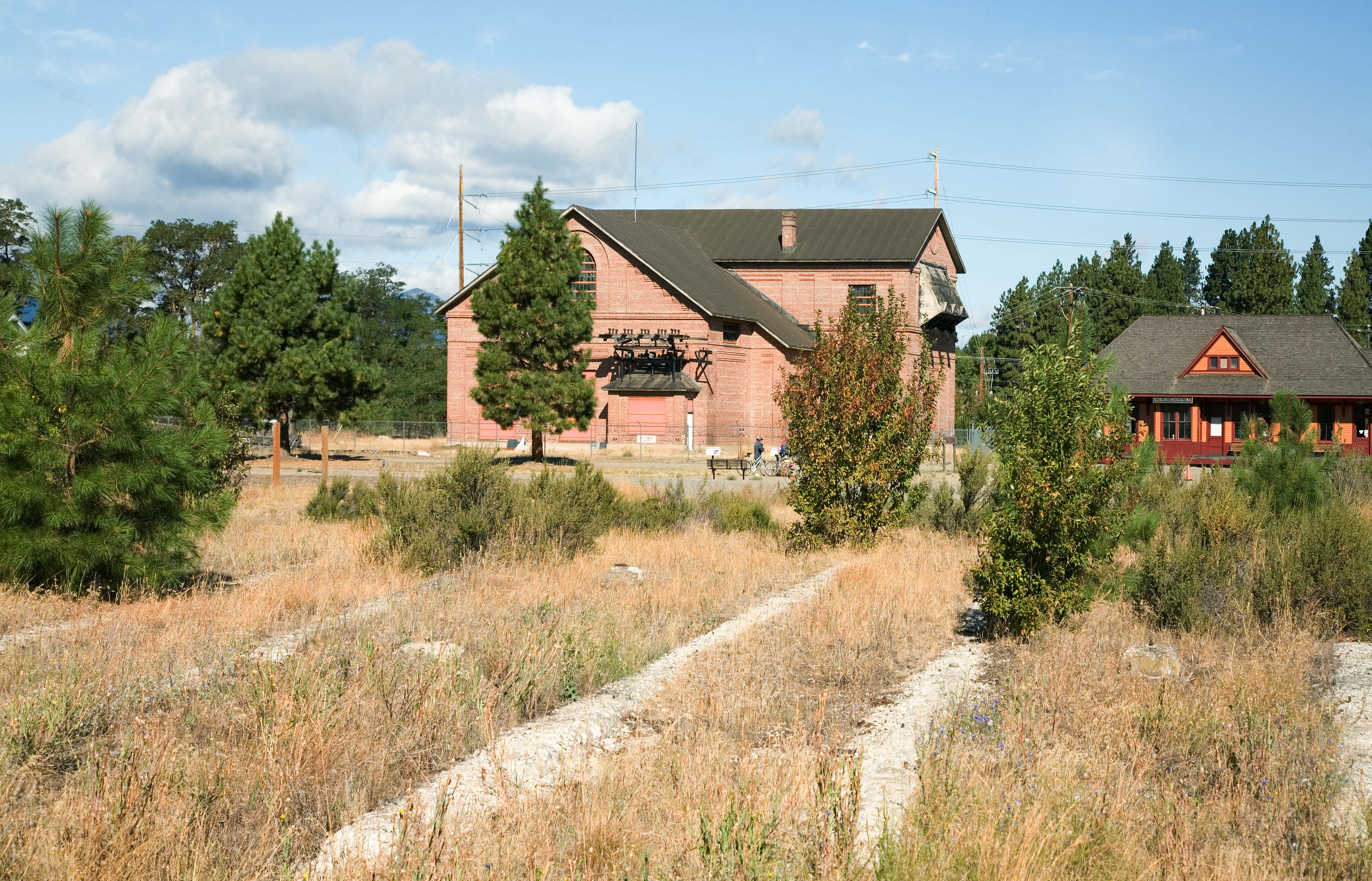
- View of the railyard. The depot is in the background to the right, the substation is in the background to the left. The ruins of the roundhouse are in the foreground.

- Location within Washington (state)
- Location: Near Milwaukee Rd. and Reservoir Canyon Rd. South Cle Elum, Washington
- Coordinates: 47°10′58″N 120°57′24″W
- Area: 24 acres (97,000 m^{2})
- Built: 1909; 1919
- Architect: Chicago, Milwaukee, St. Paul and Pacific Railroad
- Architectural style: Craftsman; 20th Century Vernacular
- MPS: Milwaukee Road MPS
- NRHP reference No.: 03000305
- Added to NRHP: April 25, 2003

The Chicago, Milwaukee, St. Paul and Pacific Railroad South Cle Elum Rail Yard located in South Cle Elum, Washington, was a division point on the Chicago, Milwaukee, St. Paul and Pacific Railroad's Coast Division. It was established by the railroad (also known as The Milwaukee Road) in 1909 during construction of its "Pacific Extension".

== History ==
After the completion of the first two transcontinental railroads into the Pacific Northwest, the Northern Pacific Railroad and the Great Northern Railway, The Milwaukee Road decided that in order to compete, it too must expand into the Northwest. It began construction on the Pacific Extension in 1906 and completed the rail line into Tacoma, Washington in 1909.

The Milwaukee Road placed division points approximately every 100 to 150 miles (240 km) apart. The division point was where locomotives were serviced, where train crews came on and off duty, and where trains were sorted and rolling stock stored. In addition, depots or stations were also placed at division points in order for passengers or freight to get on or off trains.

The division point at Cle Elum (in what would be incorporated as the Town of South Cle Elum) was placed between the terminus at Tacoma and the next division point at Othello, Washington. Thus Cle Elum was the last crew change westbound before crossing the Cascade Range at Snoqualmie Pass and going into Seattle, Washington; as well as the first crew change eastbound from Seattle to Othello and beyond to the Midwest, the Twin Cities and Chicago, Illinois.

== The rail yard ==
The rail yard at South Cle Elum consisted of the depot, the roundhouse (now a ruin), the turntable (also a ruin), ash pit, water tank (now a ruin), and the bunkhouse where train crews spent time between shifts. After The Milwaukee Road electrified around 1920, an electric substation and substation operators' residences were also built at the rail yard.

== After The Milwaukee Road abandonment and Iron Horse State Park ==
In 1980 The Milwaukee Road ceased service in Washington. It sold off much of its property. The bunkhouse became a bed and breakfast, the substation operators' houses were taken over by private individuals who continue to live in them. In lieu of paying back taxes, the railroad transferred ownership of the main line and infrastructure to the state. The John Wayne Pioneer Wagons and Riders Association was instrumental in having the State of Washington Department of Natural Resources (DNR) take over the property and create a trail. In honor of the club's activities, the trail was named the John Wayne Pioneer Trail. In 1985, the DNR transferred the trail to the State Parks and Recreation Commission who then created Iron Horse State Park. The remaining buildings such as the depot and substation, as well as the remains of the rail yard were integrated into the park. In 2018 the State Park and Recreation Commission renamed the John Wayne Pioneer Trail to the Palouse to Cascades State Park Trail.

The depot is now a museum operated for the park's benefit by the Cascade Rail Foundation.

Because of the integrity of the buildings as well as the integrity of the setting, the rail yard and associated buildings were listed in the National Register of Historic Places in 2003.

Preceding station	Milwaukee Road	Following station
Easton toward Seattle or Tacoma	Main Line	Horlick toward Chicago
