= Milwaukee Road Bunkhouse =

- U.S. National Register of Historic Places
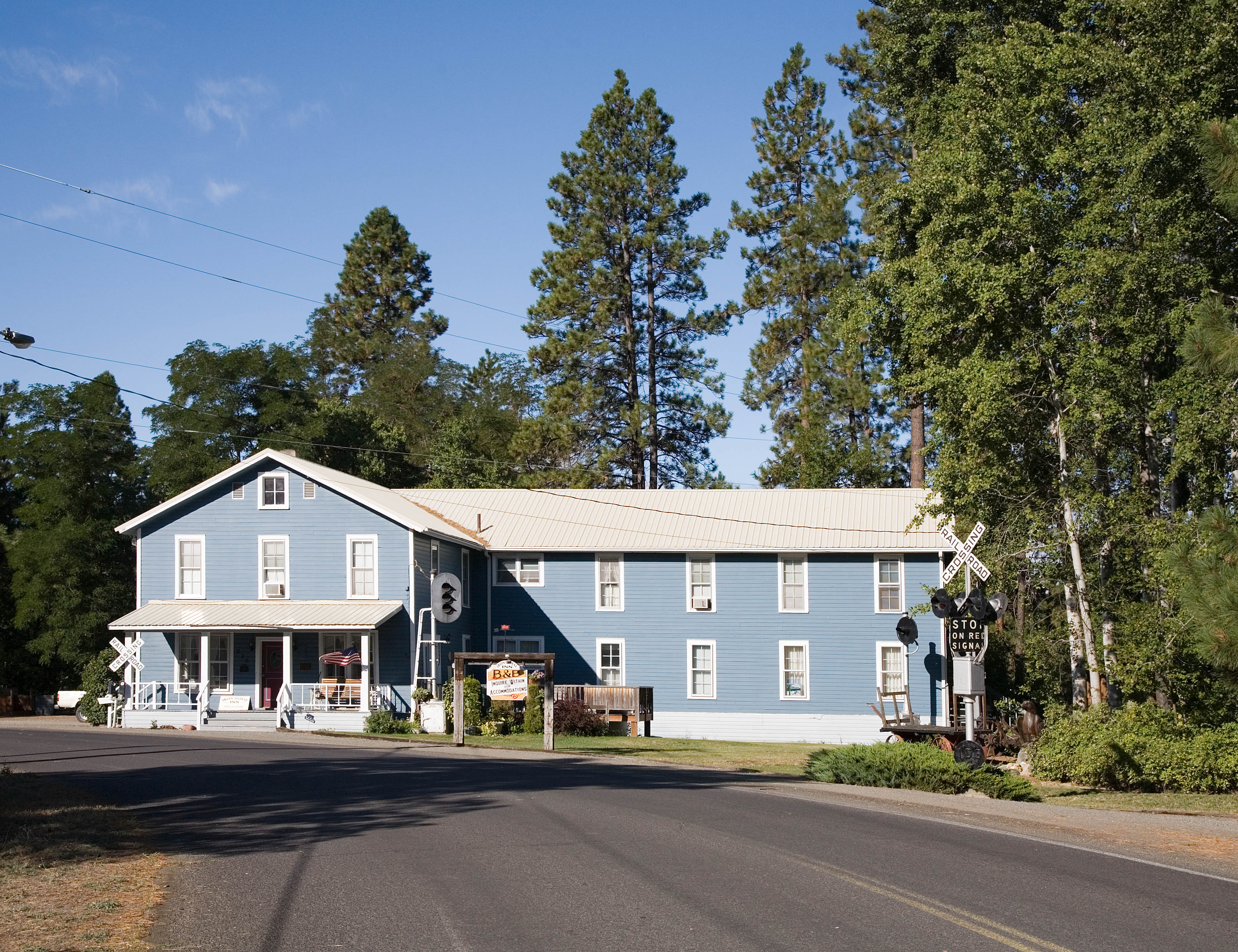
- View of the bunkhouse.

- Location within Washington (state)
- Location: 526 Marie Ave; South Cle Elum, Washington
- Coordinates: 47°10′58″N 120°57′12″W
- Built: 1909
- Architect: Chicago, Milwaukee, St. Paul and Pacific Railroad
- Architectural style: 20th Century Vernacular
- NRHP reference No.: 89000210
- Added to NRHP: March 31, 1989

The Milwaukee Road Bunkhouse was built by the Chicago, Milwaukee, St. Paul and Pacific Railroad (also known as the Milwaukee Road) in 1909 to house train crews between shifts. The bunkhouse served the crews at the rail yard and division point at South Cle Elum, Washington. The bunkhouse is an L-shaped, two-storey, wood-frame vernacular building originally placed near the depot, but moved to its present location south of the rail yard around 1920 to accommodate the electric substation when the Milwaukee Road electrified. The bunkhouse continued to serve train crews until 1974. When the railroad ceased operations in Washington in 1980, it sold the property to private individuals who converted the bunkhouse into a bed and breakfast.

Originally listed as 28 bedrooms and two bathrooms, the bunkhouse was renovated to 9 rooms The bunkhouse, now the Iron Horse Bed and Breakfast, currently rents bunkhouse rooms as well as four separate cabooses.

The bunkhouse was listed in the National Register because of its association with The Milwaukee Road and the development of railroads in Washington.
