= South Cle Elum, Washington =

- Town
- Location of South Cle Elum, Washington
- Coordinates: 47°11′8″N 120°57′11″W
- Country: United States
- State: Washington
- County: Kittitas

Government
  - Type: Mayor–council
  - Mayor: James L. DeVere

Area
  - Total: 0.40 sq mi (1.04 km^{2})
  - Land: 0.40 sq mi (1.04 km^{2})
  - Water: 0 sq mi (0.00 km^{2})
- Elevation: 1,923 ft (586 m)

Population (2020)
  - Total: 559
  - Density: 1,390/sq mi (537/km^{2})
- Time zone: UTC-8 (Pacific (PST))
  - Summer (DST): UTC-7 (PDT)
- ZIP code: 98943
- Area code: 509
- FIPS code: 53-65765
- GNIS feature ID: 1526142
- Website: Town of South Cle Elum

South Cle Elum is a town in Kittitas County, Washington, United States. The population was 559 at the 2020 census.

== History ==
In 1909, the Chicago, Milwaukee & Puget Sound Railway chose Cle Elum as a division point between the Coast and Columbia divisions on its future transcontinental line. When it was determined that Milwaukee's mainline would end up running one mile south of the city, South Cle Elum was platted. Maintenance shops and workers' bunkers were built as well as a train station. South Cle Elum was officially incorporated on August 28, 1911.

== Geography ==
According to the United States Census Bureau, the town has a total area of 0.39 square miles (1.01 km^{2}), all land.

=== Climate ===
Climate data for South Cle Elum, Washington
Month	Jan	Feb	Mar	Apr	May	Jun	Jul	Aug	Sep	Oct	Nov	Dec	Year
Record high °F (°C)	65 (18)	69 (21)	95 (35)	96 (36)	99 (37)	100 (38)	105 (41)	105 (41)	98 (37)	96 (36)	68 (20)	66 (19)	105 (41)
Mean daily maximum °F (°C)	36 (2)	41 (5)	50 (10)	57 (14)	65 (18)	71 (22)	80 (27)	80 (27)	73 (23)	58 (14)	43 (6)	33 (1)	57 (14)
Mean daily minimum °F (°C)	24 (−4)	24 (−4)	30 (−1)	34 (1)	41 (5)	47 (8)	53 (12)	52 (11)	43 (6)	34 (1)	29 (−2)	22 (−6)	36 (2)
Record low °F (°C)	−33 (−36)	−30 (−34)	0 (−18)	12 (−11)	19 (−7)	26 (−3)	30 (−1)	30 (−1)	21 (−6)	10 (−12)	−14 (−26)	−31 (−35)	−33 (−36)
Average precipitation inches (mm)	2.98 (76)	2.66 (68)	1.98 (50)	1.07 (27)	1.15 (29)	0.89 (23)	0.59 (15)	0.50 (13)	0.81 (21)	1.91 (49)	4.31 (109)	3.50 (89)	22.35 (569)

== Demographics ==
Historical population
Census	Pop.	Note	%±
1920	587		—
1930	338		−42.4%
1940	340		0.6%
1950	442		30.0%
1960	383		−13.3%
1970	374		−2.3%
1980	449		20.1%
1990	457		1.8%
2000	457		0.0%
2010	532		16.4%
2020	559		5.1%
U.S. Decennial Census

=== 2010 census ===
As of the 2010 census, there were 532 people, 235 households, and 145 families residing in the town. The population density was 1,364.1 inhabitants per square mile (526.7/km^{2}). There were 271 housing units at an average density of 694.9 units per square mile (268.3 units/km^{2}). The racial makeup of the town was 93.2% White, 0.4% African American, 1.5% Native American, 0.8% Asian, 1.5% from other races, and 2.6% from two or more races. Hispanic or Latino of any race were 5.1% of the population.

There were 235 households, of which 28.5% had children under the age of 18 living with them, 49.8% were married couples living together, 8.9% had a female householder with no husband present, 3.0% had a male householder with no wife present, and 38.3% were non-families. 30.2% of all households were made up of individuals, and 11.5% had someone living alone who was 65 years of age or older. The average household size was 2.26 and the average family size was 2.80.

The median age in the town was 42.8 years. 21.2% of residents were under the age of 18; 8% were between the ages of 18 and 24; 24% were from 25 to 44; 28.3% were from 45 to 64; and 18.6% were 65 years of age or older. The gender makeup of the town was 49.6% male and 50.4% female.

=== 2000 census ===
At the 2000 census, there were 457 people, 185 households and 123 families residing in the town. The population density was 1,089.5 people per square mile (420.7 people/km^{2}). There were 210 housing units at an average density of 500.6 units per square mile (193.3 units/km^{2}). The racial makeup of the town was 94.09% White, 1.31% Native American, 0.22% Asian, 2.41% from other races, and 1.97% from two or more races. Hispanic or Latino of any race were 4.38% of the population.

There were 185 households, of which 35.1% had children under the age of 18 living with them, 54.6% were married couples living together, 7.6% had a female householder with no husband present, and 33.5% were non-families. 29.7% of all households were made up of individuals, and 15.1% had someone living alone who was 65 years of age or older. The average household size was 2.47 and the average family size was 3.03.

Age distribution was 29.5% under the age of 18, 3.3% from 18 to 24, 30.0% from 25 to 44, 22.5% from 45 to 64, and 14.7% who were 65 years of age or older. The median age was 38 years. For every 100 females, there were 103.1 males. For every 100 females age 18 and over, there were 96.3 males.

The median household income was $45,833, and the median family income was $53,750. Males had a median income of $35,625; females, $21,625. The per capita income for the town was $22,375. About 8.1% of families and 6.6% of the population were below the poverty line, including 3.9% of those under age 18 and 7.6% of those age 65 or over.

== Government ==
South Cle Elum is classified as a town and has a non-partisan mayor–council form of government, with the mayor and five council members elected at-large for staggered four-year terms.

== Points of interest ==
- Former Milwaukee Road depot: This depot, originally built in 1909, has been restored and now houses a museum of railroad artifacts. The telegrapher's desk and equipment have been set up to show visitors how messages were communicated in the early days. There is also a cafe with fixtures that represent the original "beanery;" a place for railroad workers to eat.
- The Iron Horse State Park: This former right-of-way for the Milwaukee Road today serves as a path for hikers, cross-country skiers and horseback riders. An interpretive trail, near the former depot, shows locations of important structures, such as the roundhouse. From I-90 at exit #84, follow signs to South Cle Elum. Once in town, follow signs to parking area.
- Former Milwaukee Road Bunkhouse: Now a B&B.

== Notable people ==
- Douglas Albert Munro, the first, and so far only, United States Coast Guard recipient of the Medal of Honor, for service during the Battle of Guadalcanal in World War II.
- The Smith family of S & S Logging, stars of Ax Men on the History Channel, reside in South Cle Elum.
