= Thorp School District =

Thorp School District No. 400
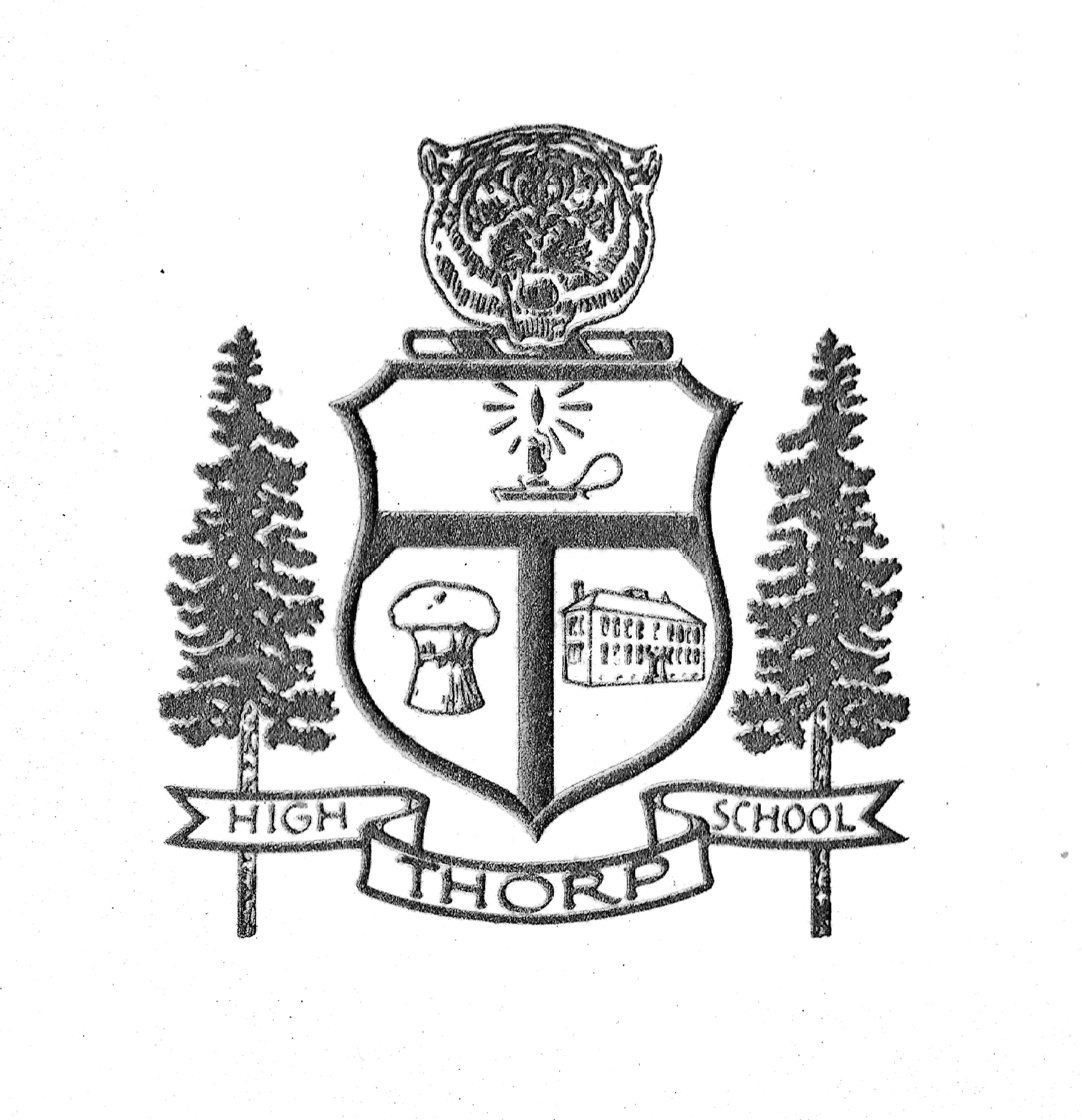

Address
- 10831 N. Thorp Highway; P.O. Box 150 Thorp, Washington, 98946; United States

District information
- Type: Public
- Motto: Learning Today, Leading Tomorrow
- Grades: PreK-12
- Established: 1873 (accredited 1895)
- Superintendent: Andrew Perkins
- NCES District ID: 5308850

Students and staff
- Enrollment: 225 (2020-2021)
- Student–teacher ratio: 10.97
- District mascot: Tigers
- Colors: Red Black

Other information
- Website: www.thorpschools.org

Thorp School District No. 400 is a public school system based in Thorp, Kittitas County, Washington. It provides fully accredited academic, athletic and award-winning extracurricular programs for all grades K-12, as well as a pre-school program.

Thorp High School was formally established as a fully accredited institution in 1895, although the Thorp School District itself dates to 1873 and is the oldest continuously operating school system in Kittitas County.

== Academics ==
Thorp School District has Nationally Board Certified and CWU Fellows teachers on staff.

The district's high school places in the top 18% out of 322 high schools in Washington's state high school rankings. The rankings are calculated by taking the standardized tests for Math, Reading, Science and Writing used by Washington to determine the proficiency level across varying grades and subjects for high schools in the state. This places Thorp as the highest rated high school in Kittitas County, well ahead of all neighboring districts in the area none of which are even ranked in the top 100.

The district started a Career and Technical Education (CTE) pathway in 2020 for grades 7–12, with courses that include Construction Technology, Ag Mechanics, Ag Power and Technology, Accounting, Web Design, Career Choices, and Digital Communications.

The district began to implement a “Farm to School” initiative in 2020, with a working farm on the school grounds. Taxpayers passed a Capital Projects Levy that will help fund the “Farm to School” infrastructure by remodeling the shop and computer lab, building a greenhouse, and remodeling kitchen facilities.

Thorp students can extend their learning with a variety of instruction such as woodworking, electronics (robotics), welding and other vocational skills.

== History ==
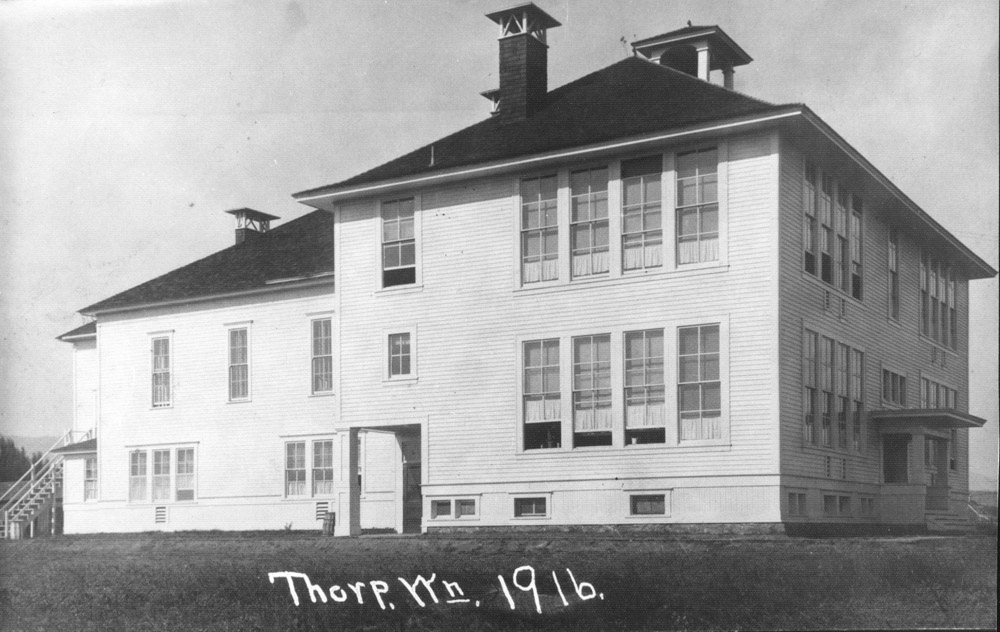
Thorp schoolhouse ca. 1916. The building served the community as Thorp High School until it was demolished in 1958 to make way for a modern structure in the same location.

When District No. 9 of Yakima County (Kittitas County was not separated from Yakima County until 1884) was formed, those who petitioned for its creation would have had no way of knowing that they were part of creating the foundation of the Thorp School District, the first public school system in what is now Kittitas County. In July 1873 a letter was sent by W. H. Crockett on behalf of the local populace around the site of present-day Thorp to the Yakima County Superintendent of Schools requesting the formation of a school district. From the letters that would follow, it appears that the new district was approved, but almost immediately a group of residents were petitioning to split-off the southern portion of the district.

A petition to divide Thorp School District No. 9 was received by the Yakima County school superintendent's office on January 11, 1875. Twelve members of Pleasant Grove community, southwest of the current town site of Thorp, asked that the superintendent grant them permission to separate from the Thorp School District.

The boundaries that would separate the southern section of District No. 9 from its northern neighbor were a point of contention for the next five years. The confusion was settled in January 1880, when Yakima County School Superintendent George W. Parrish, granted the formation of District No. 10 which encompassed the area around Splawn School on Taneum Creek. The formerly southern section of the district around the town site of Thorp reverted to the original District No. 9. It is not entirely clear where classes were conducted during the subsequent decade, however in 1885, then 7-year-old Glen Mason arrived in the Thorp area and recalled that school for District No. 9 was held in a one-room log school on the ranch of Jim McCollough in the upper valley.

On November 7, 1887, District No. 9 purchased a one-acre parcel of land from William Andrew Forgey near the present-day intersection of Sisters Road (then an extension of Goodwin Road before Interstate 90 cut it off from the town) and Thorp Cemetery Road, and by 1891 a schoolhouse had been built there which became known as the Mills School. Constructed of finely fitted and painted shiplap siding, the building was 24-feet wide and 36-feet long with 14-foot-high ceilings, making it stand apart from the log schoolhouses that were common in the area.

When the town of Thorp was officially platted around the Northern Pacific Railroad depot in 1895, residents of Thorp School District No. 9 voted to move the Mills School building a half-mile down Goodwin Road to the newly formed town. The idea of moving the schoolhouse, however, was rejected by those who lived in closer proximity to it and a dispute followed. In order to prevent the schoolhouse from being moved, the residents around Mills School formed Goodwin School District No. 46, cutting off the town from a schoolhouse. The town of Thorp and District No. 9 would go without a proper schoolhouse for several more years.

Not to be thwarted by their adversaries in the upper valley, the people of the town of Thorp in 1895 devised a scheme to move the school down the road to the town site. One night, the men of Thorp secretly entered the Mills School and absconded with the school equipment and necessary accoutrements, transferring them to a room above the dance hall in the town—from that day forward, school has been held at Thorp. When the community built its church, classes moved from the dance hall to the church.

Then in the spring of 1900, just months before a fresh enrollment of 99 students were to arrive at its doors, the first Thorp school house was completed. Located just a few blocks west of the train depot at the current location of Thorp High School, it was a one-story, two-room structure with a footprint of 46-feet by 50-feet.

In 1904, Goodwin District No. 46, which had split with the Thorp district just eight years earlier, was reunified with it to form Thorp School District No. 27, becoming the first consolidated school district in Kittitas County.

In 1912, the original two-room school house was moved back a few yards, and a new two-story school house added on to the front of it by John Newman and Glen Mason. The building had a capacity of 200, utilizing the old school house which was attached to it in the back, as a gymnasium and classrooms for mechanical arts and home economics. During the early years there were eight grades and three years of high school, but only two years were accredited. The first day of school in this building was September 12, 1912. The first principal was Amos Foster.

Over the next 26 years, the Thorp School District would continue to absorb the smaller rural school districts that surrounded it. In 1917, Thorp School District No. 27 consolidated with Splawn School District and became Thorp School District No. 45. In 1929, the district again consolidated, adding nearly 60 students to its enrollment, to become Thorp School District No. 102. Finally, in 1942, Thorp Prairie School District No. 29 was consolidated with District No. 102, forming the present boundaries of Thorp School District No. 400.

- Thorp Grade School
- U.S. National Register of Historic Places
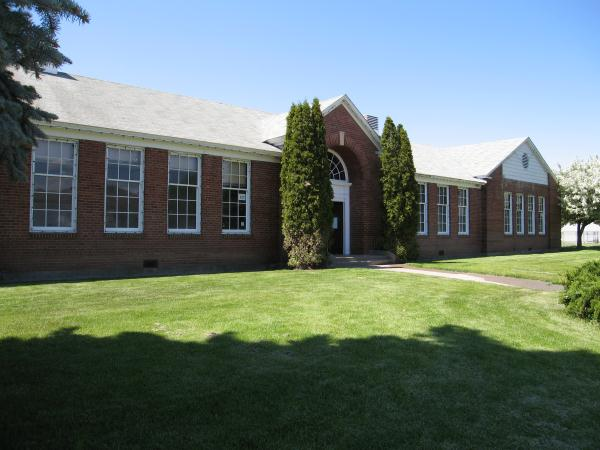
- Thorp Grade School (Photo 2009)

- Location within Washington (state)
- Location: Thorp, Washington
- Built: 1936
- Architect: John W. Maloney
- Architectural style: Colonial Revival
- NRHP reference No.: 09000541
- Designated NRHP: July 16, 2009

By 1932, the district's enrollment had exceeded the seating capacity of the Thorp school house, and with the town benefitting from an influx of workers from the Highline Canal project and logging operations at Taneum Canyon, plans were drawn up in 1935, for a new brick elementary school to be located next to the existing school house at Thorp. Built in 1936, at a cost of $41,000 during the depths of the Great Depression and partially funded by the WPA, the new elementary school became known as Thorp Grade School. One of the earliest celebrations to be held in the new gymnasium at the school was an Armistice Day program on November 11, 1936, which was led by the district's beloved longtime superintendent Victor Karlson.

Thorp Grade School still stands today, and has been used continuously by the district since its construction. A finely crafted red brick Colonial Revival structure, it was designed by noted architect John W. Maloney. After the construction of the grade school, the old schoolhouse continued to serve the district as Thorp High School until 1957, when it was razed to make way for a one-story, modern cinderblock structure in the same location. The new Thorp High School was opened in 1958.

The district was twice considered for consolidation with the nearby Ellensburg School District, first in 1944, and again in 1983. In both cases, a small but vocal group of consolidation proponents were defeated by a massive and well-organized opposition of community leaders and concerned citizens. In the first instance, out of four hearings on the subject only one vote was cast for consolidation with hundreds opposing it. In the second instance, after months of public campaigning by merger supporters accompanied by an intense debate among voters and community members, the question of consolidation was brought before the seven-member Kittitas County Committee on School District Organization. At the conclusion of a 4-hour public hearing on the evening of March 1, 1983, before an overwhelmingly anti-consolidation, standing-room-only crowd at the Thorp High School gymnasium, the committee voted unanimously to reject consolidation of the district.

Voters in the district approved a $1.4 million bond measure for school construction on February 7, 1989, by a margin of nearly 80 percent. The 20-year bond was matched by $927,000 in state funds to renovate and expand the 1958 school building. The building, which was billed as the "first high-tech school in the county," included the addition of ten new classrooms, a gymnasium with seating for 450 people, and a student commons area which doubles as a performance venue.

The 1936 Grade School building was subsequently renovated to provide additional instructional space and classrooms for the growing needs of the district, while preserving its classic architectural integrity. On July 16, 2009, the historic building was placed on the National Register of Historic Places as a significant example of American rural education.

== Thorp High School ==
Student clubs and activities at Thorp High School include Associated Student Body (student government), Future Farmers of America (FFA), Model United Nations, Future Business Leaders of America (FBLA), Family Career and Community Leaders of America (FCCLA), Band and Honor Society. In the past, the Spanish Club has taken chaperoned trips to Mexico to immerse the students in Spanish-speaking culture and language.

In 2001, Thorp High School seniors made national news when they donated their entire class fund which they had saved for years, meant to be used for their Senior Trip, to the American Red Cross to help victims of the terrorist attacks of September 11th. Washington Superintendent of Public Instruction Terry Burgeson met with the 15 students of the class and said of them, "This is quite a class [...] I think they're cool."

Thorp's Teaching American History Grant, To Preserve and Protect Our Future, in partnership with Central Washington University's media production department, received two Regional Emmy Awards. The first award, given in 2008, was for the production of the DVD "Moments in American History". The second Emmy Award was bestowed on June 5, 2010, in recognition of Thorp's TAHG production of the website Moments in American History. The website became the second most popular destination on iTunes.

On April 28, 2011, the White House announced that President Barack Obama had selected Thorp High School science teacher Dawn Sparks as a recipient of the prestigious Presidential Award for Excellence in Mathematics and Science Teaching. Sparks was one of only 85 math and science teachers from across the nation to be selected, and one of only two from the state of Washington. Winners of this Presidential honor receive a $10,000 award from the National Science Foundation and an expense-paid trip to Washington, D.C., for an awards ceremony and several days of educational and celebratory events, including visits with members of Congress.

=== Patrimony ===
The Thorp High School mascot was originally the Red Devil, a now controversial slang term relating to Native Americans, however a vote of the student body in 1921 changed the mascot to the Tiger, while the school colors remained red and black. Thorp High School competes as a 1B member of the WIAA North Central Washington Conference.

The high school yearbook, the Hialitza (/ˌhaɪəˈlɪtzə/ hy-ə-LIT-zə), was first produced in 1922, and, although it has experienced some recent interruptions, has been published annually by the town's high school students to chronicle the events of each school term. The name of the publication is attributed to Chinook Jargon:

"When an Indian traveling through a mountainous country reaches the top of a mountain, he unconsciously stretches forth his hand and says Hialitza which when translated means a panoramic view or great sight. The name stands for the great outdoors and that which lies beyond in the distance. So, this record is symbolic of the Seniors who now look back over their four years in High School as in a panoramic view and into the future years they see only a haze in the distance. Thus, upon reading this publication one looks upon a panoramic view of the Students and Student Activities of Thorp High School."

Long-standing traditions at the school include Homecoming, Spirit Week, Prom, Baccalaureate and the Senior Trip (a special excursion by the Senior class upon graduating, often to places like Disneyland or Canada). Each year prior to graduation, it is the practice of the Junior class to produce the Junior-Senior Banquet at which graduating students offer "Wills" to bequeath a certain item or comedic anecdote for each member of the Junior class, and Juniors offer "Prophesies" of the future for each member of the Senior class. Another yearly event at the school is the annual Harvest Carnival.
