= Braided River =

- Parent company: The Mountaineers Books
- Country of origin: United States
- Headquarters location: Seattle, Washington
- Publication types: Books
- Nonfiction topics: photography books
- Official website: www.braidedriver.org

Braided River is a 501(c)(3) nonprofit publishing imprint of The Mountaineers Books based in Seattle, Washington. Braided River produces large-format photography books that address critical threats to wilderness. In addition to publishing works, Braided River collaborates with partner organizations to develop exhibits intended to reach diverse audiences.

== History ==
Seasons of Life and Land, photographed by Subhankar Banerjee, was the first book to be published by Mountaineers Books in partnership with Alaska Wilderness League. The book featured the animals, native people and landscape of the Arctic National Wildlife Refuge and identified threats to the future of the refuge.

On March 19, 2003, the book was held up on the Senate floor during a debate about oil drilling in the Arctic National Wildlife Refuge. The provision to open the land to development, tacked onto a budget bill, was defeated by a vote of 52 to 48. Soon after the vote, Banerjee received notice that the Smithsonian Institution's National Museum of Natural History, which depends on Congress for its funding, had decided to move his exhibit from a prominent space near the museum's rotunda to the bottom floor. The exhibit's captions were also expunged of quotes from President Jimmy Carter, and attorneys for the museum insisted that Banerjee remove all mentions of the Smithsonian from his book. The museum later denied making any decisions due to political pressure.

The controversy drew significant media coverage that launched the book—and the Arctic Refuge—into the public spotlight and prompted the creation of the Braided River in 2007. The success of Seasons of Life and Land was a launching point for future Braided River books and awareness campaigns.
