= Stampede Pass =

Mountain pass in Washington

- Location within the United States Location within Washington (state)
- Elevation: 3,672 ft (1,119 m)
- Traversed by: Forest Service Road 54, BNSF Railway

Third Approach
- Location: King / Kittitas counties, Washington, US
- Range: Cascade Range
- Coordinates: 47.2834°N 121.3512°W

Stampede Pass (elevation 3,672 feet (1,119 m)) is a mountain pass in the northwest United States, through the Cascade Range in Washington. Southeast of Seattle and east of Tacoma, its importance to transportation lies almost entirely with railroading, as no paved roads cross it. It is approximately twelve miles (20 km) south-southeast of Snoqualmie Pass, the gap for Interstate 90, and two miles (3 km) south of Keechelus Lake.

The pass, and the tunnel to the south which takes advantage of it, the 1.86-mile (3.0 km) Stampede Tunnel (47.279°N 121.323°W), just below 2,850 feet (870 m), played a significant role in the history of the Northern Pacific Railway. The tunnel opened for service in May 1888, and is currently operated as the Stampede Subdivision by the NP's successor, BNSF Railway.

After over a decade of dormancy in the late 20th century, the Stampede Pass Line and Tunnel were reopened in 1997 by BNSF, which uses the route as one of two direct Northern Transcon main lines through the Cascades, between Spokane and the Seattle metropolitan area.

== Discovery of the pass ==
Northern Pacific Railroad had been notified by the federal government that their lack of a direct route from Yakima to the Puget Sound was considered violation of their charter. Faced with losing millions of acres in their land grant, they began earnestly exploring a route over the Cascades.

The first known discovery of the pass was made by Virgil Bogue, a civil engineer for the Northern Pacific. (Bogue went on to become chief engineer of the Union Pacific Railroad and later the Western Pacific Railroad.)

Below is Bogue's report, written in January 1881, from the collection of Robert A. Robey, the Northern Pacific's roadmaster at Auburn, Washington, in charge of the line across Stampede Pass throughout the 1960s.

"About January 1, 1881, I received instructions from Colonel Isaac W. Smith to explore Tacoma Pass, which had been discovered by J.T. Sheets in the Autumn previous, and the range to the north of that pass to some point, which would cover all possible passes, that might lead out of the Green River, Washington in that direction. In the Autumn previous, four cabins had been built by a party under Colonel Smith's direction in suitable localities, between Thorpe's Prairie, subsequently known as Supply Camp, and a point four or five miles west of Tacoma Pass. A party of three or four men, well supplied with provisions, had been left at Thorpe's Prairie during the winter, with instructions to be ready for any orders they might receive. When we left Tacoma, therefore, to begin the exploration, orders were sent to these men to cross the range, and build a fifth cabin as far down Green River as practicable, and to try to meet the party exploring from the West.

"We left Tacoma without any delay and went to McClintock's situated on the divide between White River and Green River (near Enumclaw, Washington). From McClintock's we were obliged to cut a trail through the brush and fallen logs. Our first camp at McClintock's was January 17, 1881. We worked steadily at the trail, moving camp frequently, and camped on Green River at a point 500 to 1,000 feet east of the present second crossing of that stream on January 26, 1881.

"Our camp on Green River was Camp No. 5.

"We continued our work on the trail, arriving and camping at Camp No. 7 on February 8, 1881, on Green River at the mouth of a stream which we subsequently called Canoe Creek, because we tried to make a canoe there and failed. The snow on our arrival, was about two feet deep and crusted over. We found that the pack trains could go no farther, and that it was quite impracticable to cut out a trail. We concluded therefore, to take to the sleds with which we had been provided, packing on men's backs, in steep places where the sleds could not be used. The party was supplied with snow shoes; but it was not always practicable to use them.

"With pack-trains bringing supplies to the shed at Canoe Creek, and sleds, etc., beyond, the party kept on, arriving at Camp No. 10 on February 19. At this place we were obliged to remain four days, owing to a rain storm which flooded all the streams in the river to such an extent that they were practically impassable. the morning of February 24 we got under way again, and shortly after leaving camp, saw a large eagle soaring above our heads, and from this circumstance named the camp we had left 'Eagle Gorge.'

"On March 2, we reached Camp No. 13 on Green River, not far about the mouthy of what was subsequently known as Smay Creek, (near Maywood) [Smay Creek forms the western boundary of what in 1911 became Elmer G. Morgan's Nagrom]. the labor and exposure of the party since leaving Canoe Creek as well as before had somewhat discouraged some of the men, and I determined to push on from this point with a small party of three or four, without any outfit but provisions for a few days, with the hope of finding the cabin, which the party at Thorpe's Prairie had been instructed to build as above described.

"Giving the men who remained behind orders to spend their time in getting provisions up to their camp from Canoe Creek, until they should hear from me, I started on my trip on the morning of March 3, my companions being Joe Wilson, Indian Peter and Indian Charley.

"Our first camp, which I called Camp No. 14, continuing the camp numbers brought from below, was on a hill not far above Green River Hot Springs. Our next camp, No. 15, was on a gravel bar in what we afterward called Sunday Creek, because we did a great deal of work near Lester along that creek on the Sabbath. On the night following February 5 our Camp No. 16 was at the foot of the ridge in the angle formed by Camp Creek and Sunday Creek (near Borup). We had, therefore, passed entirely by the cabin, which we afterward found located on Green River about one mile above the mouth of Sunday Creek. Our course having been on the north bank of Green River, we had naturally followed Sunday Creek, not having seen any other large stream[s], owing to the heavy growth of timber.

"The day of our arrival at Camp No. 16, we found that our Indian companions were not of much use, and were consuming the provisions, so we sent them back to the main body of men with instructions to get more provisions and follow in our foot-steps. We remained at Camp No. 16 until the morning of February 9, exploring the streams and ridges in that locality, hoping to find some trace of the cabin, or of the men who were to meet us. While we were camped there, Joe Wilson started back toward the main camp and met the Indians who were bringing more provisions.

"He sent the Indians back, and brought what provisions they had himself, so that we left Camp No. 16 on the morning of February 9 feeling pretty well. We had then concluded that the cabin we were looking for was on some other branch of Green River, and we proceeded down Sunday Creek, looking as well as we could for the mouth of some other large stream. This we found without much difficulty, and shortly afterward we came upon signs and blazed upon trees, that indicated the presence of white men. When we finally found the cabin, the men were not in but had evidently left it several days before. We shortly found their trail, and followed it across the mountain. arriving at Tacoma Pass in a snow storm, March 9, at 5:45 pm, the Aneroid Barometer, which I carried marking an elevation of 3,760 feet. We continued across the Pass, arriving at what was known as Cabin No. 3 on Cabin Creek, near the mouth of Coal Creek, after dark. The following day we went to Thorpe's Prairie, where we found our friends. From that point I sent a messenger back across the mountains, who went over our trail in four days to Tacoma.

"To get well rested, we remained at Thorpe's Prairie from March 10 until the morning of March 14. We then left for Tacoma Pass. During the 14th, 15th, and 16th, we explored Cabin Creek, Tacoma Pass, and the pass immediately north of it, called Sheet's Pass.

"On the morning of March 16, we left Cabin No. 3, where we had been camped for our explorations in the vicinity of Tacoma Pass, to go along the range toward the north. We traveled on snow shoes, the men packing such provisions as we had. The snow was from seven to 30 or more feet deep. We followed up the main stream of Cabin Creek climbing to a point about 600 feet east of the range on the evening of the 16th, where we camped until morning. In the morning we climbed to the summit and followed the ridge to a high butte, which is south of, and overlooks Camp Creek and the headwaters of Sunday Creek. here one of the men stumbled and fell down a steep slope, plunging in the snow.

"As his snow shoe was the cause of the fall, we named the mountain Snow Shoe Butte. That night we camped lower down on the ridge between the butte and Stampede Pass.

"The next day we tried to find the pass, which had clearly seen from the butte. The course of the range for a long distance was southeasterly, apparently tending in the direction of Yakima River. This deceived us as to our course, and we went back upon it several times, hoping to find a ridge leading to the north, which we presumed would be in the main divide. this search finally proving useless we camped on the night of March 18, at nearly the same place we had on the night of the 17th. The weather on the 18th was cold and the mountain tops covered with a cold fog, which was sometimes a snow storm.

"On the morning of the 19th we broke camp at about 8:30 am. The weather was fine, not a cloud in the sky. We had finally concluded that we must stick to the ridge we were on, and we pushed forward, and had such good luck that at 10:10 A.M. we arrived at the pass, the Aneroid barometer marking the elevation of 3,495 feet. Andy Drury, one of the men, remarked as we looked down upon the slopes of Sunday Creek and Green River, that it was the prettiest pass in the mountains. We remained only a few moments, and then continued our way north, discovering in the course of that and the succeeding day, three other passes. From the most northerly pass, which we found to be on the last pass leading out from the north toward any tributary of Green River, we explored a stream leading into Lake Kitchelos (now Kechelus). We arrived at Lake Kitchelos at 5:15 P.M. on March 21 and the next day at Cabin No. 1, which still stands near the mouth of Cabin Creek. The following day took us to Thorpe's Prairie.

"By this time, more provisions had commenced to arrive from Ellensburg, for use in making surveys. As we were then familiar with the country, these provisions were sent through to Tacoma Pass as fast as they arrived, on sleds and on men's backs. We accumulated enough provisions there to commence the surveys on April 1. The party of men, which I had left on Green River near Smay Creek having then arrived the surveys were commenced, and were prosecuted during the season with a large force, several lines being run from Tacoma Pass and from Stampede Pass.

"All passes to the north of Stampede Pass were also examined, and sufficient instrumental surveys made to determine their character, with the result that Stampede Pass was finally selected as the most available one in the range. Besides myself, the following named men were in the party which explored the range from Tacoma Pass, north and which discovered Stampede Pass: James Gregg, Andy Drury and Matthew Champion. Gregg was the cook."

== Naming of the pass ==
Bogue wrote the Washington State Historical Society's William Pierce Bonney about the naming of the pass in 1916.

"I had a trail cutting party camped near Stampede Lake this party was controlled by a foreman who I thought did not accomplish much work. When the other party which had been cutting the trail from canoe Creek up Green River to my camp near the mouth of Sunday Creek finished its work, I sent its foreman to the camp occupied by the former mentioned party then at Stampede Lake, with a letter authorizing him to take charge. A large number of the former mentioned party then stampeded. There was quite a large fir tree at this Stampede Lake camp, which had a large blaze out on it by the men remaining and with little piece of charcoal from the campfire they printed on the blaze the words 'Stampede Camp.'"

Bonney, who worked for the Northern Pacific on Stampede Pass, added, "When the men quit work about the middle of the afternoon, the day of the stampede, they repaired to camp where they were busy waiting for supper; when the foreman came and announced to the cook that the food in his charge belonged to the railroad company was furnished to feed men that were working for the company, that these men had severed their connection with the company, hence were not entitled to be fed; then was when the real stampede began."

(W.P. Bonney, Secretary, Washington State Historical Society, to 29th Annual Farmers Picnic, Enumclaw, 8-6-21. Bonney worked on Stampede 1881-2.)

When discovered some weeks earlier, it had been named Garfield Pass, in honor of recently inaugurated President Garfield, but Stampede Pass became the name generally used.

== The summit switchback ==
The Northern Pacific completed Stampede Tunnel under Stampede Pass in 1888 (see section below). In the meantime, however, the NP decided not to wait for completion, and built a switchback across the summit of the pass.

According to A Brief History of the Northern Railway, a switchback with 5.6 percent grade was studied by Chief Engineer Anderson as early as 1884. The line was surveyed in spring of 1886. There were three switchbacks on each side of the Cascades, and a great double horseshoe at the summit. Construction of the switchback was plagued by snowfall, and a cut through snow 40 feet (12 m) deep was required at the summit. The switchback included a mile of solid log cribbing, 3/4 mi (1.2 km) of snowsheds, and 31 trestles. When the ground thawed in the spring of 1887, it shifted and settled the newly laid track, requiring more work. The Northern Pacific spent $15,000 (equivalent to $537,500 in 2025) on laborers' protection during the switchback's construction.

To operate the line the Northern Pacific ordered the two largest steam locomotives in the world (at that time). Despite their size, the steep grades meant one locomotive was stationed at each end of their five-car trains. Trains took an hour and fifteen minutes to traverse the eight-mile-long (13 km) switchback, a brakeman riding the rooftops every two cars. The first experimental train over the switchback was on June 6, 1887. The first scheduled passenger train over the switchback arrived in Tacoma at 7:15 pm on July 3, 1887.

Even after the completion of the tunnel, the switchback was reopened for brief periods in the 1890s as maintenance was carried out below.

== Stampede Tunnel ==
Stampede Tunnel
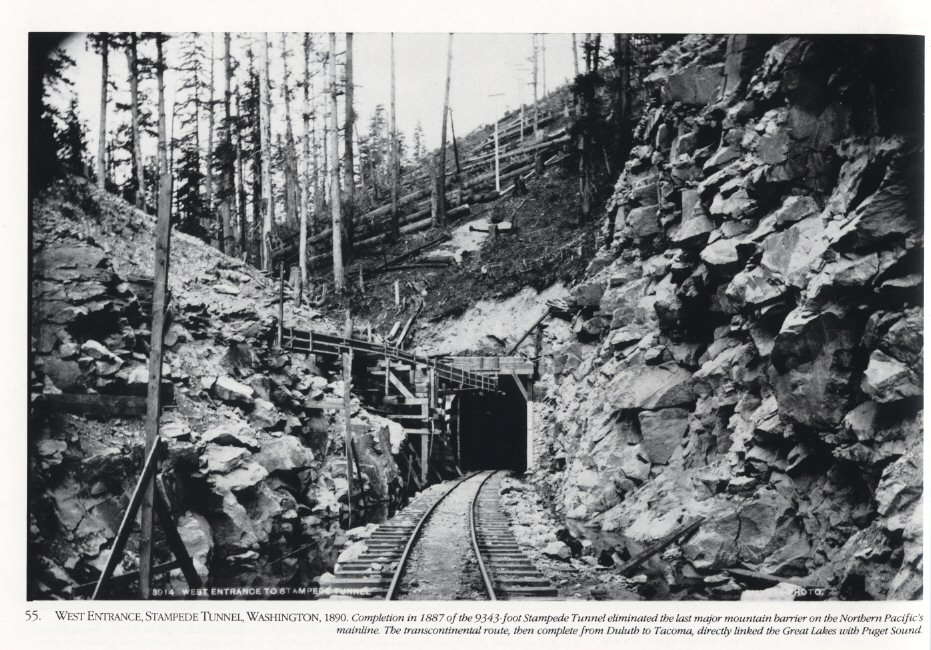
- Western entrance in 1890 by Frank Jay Haynes
- Interactive map of Stampede Tunnel

Overview
- Line: BNSF, (originally Northern Pacific)
- Location: Stampede Pass, Washington, U.S.
- Coordinates: 47.279°N 121.323°W
- Status: Active
- Crosses: Cascade Range

Operation
- Work began: 1886
- Opened: 1888, 138 years ago
- Traffic: Railroad
- Character: Freight

Technical
- Length: 1.8644 miles (3.00 km)
- No. of tracks: Single
- Track gauge: Standard
- Max elevation: 2,827 feet (860 m)
- Tunnel clearance: 22 feet (6.7 m)
- Width: 16 feet (4.9 m)

First tunnel location made by James T. Kingsbury, assistant engineer, August 1882. Other tunnel lines were run by the following named engineers, but all had practically the same initial point at the west end: John A. Hulburt, John Quincy Barlow (1861-1949), and F.C. Tucker. Final location made by William H. Kennedy.

J.Q. Jamieson was assistant engineer in charge from the commencement of work until October 23, 1887, when he was succeeded by Edwin Harrison McHenry (later chief engineer of the Northern Pacific), who continued in charge until the completion of the tunnel, snowsheds and sidetracks at both ends of the tunnel.

F.M. Haines was transitman on the west end and Andrew Gibson on the east end during the entire time the tunnel was under construction. N.B. Tunder was the contractor's superintendent on the west end and Captain Sidney J. Bennet, a brother of the contractor, was superintendent on the east end.

The Contract for driving the tunnel was awarded to Nelson Bennett January 21, 1886.

- Work commenced on east heading with hand drills on February 13, 1886.
- Air drills were introduced June 18, 1886. Average daily progress with hand drills—3.52 lineal feet. Average daily progress with air drills—5.8 lineal feet.
- Work commenced on the west heading with hand drills on April 1, 1886. Air drills were introduced September 1, 1886. Average daily progress with hand drills—4 lineal feet. Average daily progress with air drills—6.9.
- Headings met May 3, 1888.
- Tunnels met May 11, 1888.
- The tunnel opened for traffic on May 27, 1888
- Masonry lining began on June 16, 1889, and was completed on November 16, 1895.

Costs

- 9,844.1 lineal feet of tunnel at $78 per lineal foot--$767,839.80.
- 31,081 cubic yards of extra excavation at $4.50 per cubic yard--$138,864.50.
- 3,008,638 feet B.M. in lining at $35 per M.--$105,302.33.
- $1,013,006.63 total.
- Masonry lining total cost per lineal foot--$54.08.
- Cement used: 45,979 barrels (7,310.1 m^{3}).
- Bricks used: 9,816,620, most from Tacoma.

Fatalities

- Seventeen killed and seventeen injured west.
- Eleven killed and twenty-two injured east. One killed by construction train.
- One brickmason foreman was killed by falling rock, two laborers were killed by a work train, and one laborer was electrocuted.

The Stampede Pass railroad tunnel is arched in the center; that is, daylight is not detectable at either end of the tunnel when looking through to the other end; unlike both the first (2.6 mile, 1900) and second (7.8 mile, 1929) Cascade Tunnels of the Great Northern Railway at Stevens Pass, which were "boresighted" and ran in a straight line and at a constant downward angle from northeast to southwest. Steam engines ascending in either direction within the confines of the Stampede Tunnel was the cause of many train crews and passengers being nearly choked to death by the buildup of exhaust gasses within the tunnel; this led to a forced-air ventilation equipment being added at the west end of the tunnel at a later date. The grade is 2.2 percent on the east side from the town of Easton and 2.2 percent on the west side from the town of Lester.

Andrew Gibson, born and educated in Scotland, began work for the NP on main line construction in Oregon, about eight miles (13 km) west of Portland, as a clerk for Mr. O. Phil, assistant engineer, about July 1, 1883, and continued in the same position until the party was disbanded, about the end of October. Was leveler for Colin Mcintosh, assistant engineer on Kalama Inclines during January 1884. Went to work as a "bush hook dude" with William H. Kennedy on Cascade Division Surveys on April 27, 1884, starting at South Prairie and working east. Promoted to rodman about the beginning of June and to leveler about the middle of August, when the location of the 25 miles (40 km) from South Prairie to Eagle Gorge was completed. Gibson went on to work for engineers William T. Chalk, John Quincy Barlow, J.Q. Jamieson, and Herbert S. Huson, literally all over the Stampede Pass line. Gibson ran the level and took topography for the switch back, worked on the final location of the tunnel line, crossings of the Yakima River in the Yakima Canyon. Finally, he was made an assistant engineer himself, overseeing the lining of the tunnel as well as filling the numerous temporary trestles built in the haste to finish the line on time. It is primarily through his diligent work that detailed first hand accounts of the work are available. Gibson went on to oversee the NP's building on the Palouse, the giant west end tie plant at Paradise, Montana, finally becoming the chief engineer in charge of maintenance of way in Saint Paul. He started out very modestly, clearing brush from what would become the Main Street of the Northwest.

== Capacity increase ==
A major revision of the line between Lester and Stampede Tunnel was undertaken between 1912 and 1915. This included a new roundhouse at Lester, double tracking the line from Lester to the west portal of Tunnel 4, a small tunnel just a mile west of Stampede Tunnel, and replacing the former loop through Weston with a large steel viaduct. At the same time, the route from Martin, at the east portal of Stampede Tunnel, was double-tracked down to Easton.

In August 1984, the Burlington Northern mothballed the line as redundant. Between 1995 and 1996, BN and its successor BNSF Railway, rehabilitated the line as a response to increasing traffic pressures in the Pacific Northwest.

BNSF and government agencies in Washington state are committed to enlarging Stampede Tunnel to accommodate larger intermodal freight cars; the current height of 22 feet (6.7 m) is insufficient for double-stacked intermodal cars. That said, BNSF stated in 2001 such a project would only be undertaken once the two alternate routes were at capacity. A 2006 study by Cambridge Systematics for the Washington State Transportation Commission determined that the capacity of the Stampede Subdivision was sufficient or "reliable". In 2008, BNSF again stated there were no immediate plans. In 2022, a study was launched to investigate the costs of such an enlargement.

== Recreational access ==
The Mountaineers have a ski area just southeast of the eastern portal of the Stampede Pass tunnel. Built in 1928, Meany Lodge with 3 rope tows, is open to all during winter weekends from early January to early March. It hosts a PSIA certified winter sports school and is one of the oldest ski areas in the nation.

The Palouse to Cascades State Park Trail is about halfway between Stampede Pass and I-90.

In 1939, the Northern Pacific opened a ski area on the eastern portal of the Stampede Tunnel called Martin Ski Dome. The resort was to compete with the Milwaukee Ski Bowl a few miles north at Hyak. The Martin Ski Dome closed in 1942 with the start of World War II and then was sold in 1946, after the end of the war, to the University of Washington students association. It re-opened as Husky Chalet and had two rope tows.

The only public access to the pass is from the east; access from the west is not open to the public, since this is a part of the Green River watershed which is managed (and partly owned by) Tacoma Water to ensure the city's water supply is pure and fresh.

== Climate ==
Stampede Pass has a dry-summer humid continental climate (Köppen Dsb), bordering on a subarctic climate (Köppen Dsc) or subpolar oceanic climate (Csc).

Climate data for Stampede Pass, Washington, 1991–2020 normals, 1944-2020 extremes: 3959ft (1207m)
Month	Jan	Feb	Mar	Apr	May	Jun	Jul	Aug	Sep	Oct	Nov	Dec	Year
Record high °F (°C)	59 (15)	59 (15)	63 (17)	79 (26)	86 (30)	90 (32)	93 (34)	93 (34)	91 (33)	80 (27)	63 (17)	64 (18)	93 (34)
Mean maximum °F (°C)	45.7 (7.6)	44.7 (7.1)	51.2 (10.7)	61.1 (16.2)	71.8 (22.1)	78.6 (25.9)	84.0 (28.9)	85.1 (29.5)	78.9 (26.1)	64.5 (18.1)	50.9 (10.5)	42.9 (6.1)	83.8 (28.8)
Mean daily maximum °F (°C)	32.4 (0.2)	34.7 (1.5)	40.2 (4.6)	45.7 (7.6)	53.4 (11.9)	59.6 (15.3)	68.2 (20.1)	69.0 (20.6)	62.7 (17.1)	49.3 (9.6)	37.8 (3.2)	31.9 (−0.1)	48.7 (9.3)
Daily mean °F (°C)	28.6 (−1.9)	30.4 (−0.9)	34.6 (1.4)	39.2 (4.0)	45.9 (7.7)	51.5 (10.8)	58.9 (14.9)	60.0 (15.6)	54.7 (12.6)	43.6 (6.4)	33.7 (0.9)	28.1 (−2.2)	42.4 (5.8)
Mean daily minimum °F (°C)	24.8 (−4.0)	26.0 (−3.3)	29.0 (−1.7)	32.7 (0.4)	38.4 (3.6)	43.3 (6.3)	49.6 (9.8)	51.0 (10.6)	46.7 (8.2)	37.8 (3.2)	29.5 (−1.4)	24.3 (−4.3)	36.1 (2.3)
Mean minimum °F (°C)	12.4 (−10.9)	14.7 (−9.6)	19.6 (−6.9)	23.7 (−4.6)	29.3 (−1.5)	33.4 (0.8)	39.5 (4.2)	40.7 (4.8)	35.0 (1.7)	26.8 (−2.9)	19.1 (−7.2)	13.4 (−10.3)	8.0 (−13.3)
Record low °F (°C)	−11 (−24)	−10 (−23)	1 (−17)	16 (−9)	20 (−7)	28 (−2)	30 (−1)	34 (1)	26 (−3)	15 (−9)	−5 (−21)	−21 (−29)	−21 (−29)
Average precipitation inches (mm)	11.71 (297)	7.92 (201)	8.84 (225)	6.46 (164)	4.65 (118)	3.30 (84)	1.29 (33)	1.56 (40)	3.95 (100)	9.00 (229)	13.71 (348)	12.60 (320)	84.99 (2,159)
Average snowfall inches (cm)	85.7 (218)	69.8 (177)	67.3 (171)	43.0 (109)	14.2 (36)	1.4 (3.6)	0.4 (1.0)	trace	1.6 (4.1)	18.1 (46)	65.3 (166)	80.0 (203)	446.8 (1,134.7)
Average precipitation days (≥ 0.01 in)	20.0	17.6	19.4	19.7	16.6	14.3	7.2	6.2	9.2	16.3	20.5	19.9	186.9
Average snowy days (≥ 0.1 in)	19.6	17.6	19.2	15.0	7.2	1.0	0.1	0.0	0.7	5.9	15.6	19.5	121.4
Source 1: NOAA
Source 2: XMACIS2 (records, monthly max/min & 1944-1988 snowfall/days)

== See also ==
- Easton, Washington
- Lester, Washington
- Roslyn, Washington
- Cascade Tunnel – Great Northern
- Snoqualmie Tunnel – Milwaukee Road
- Martin, Washington
- Meany Lodge
