= Edmond S. Meany =

American politician

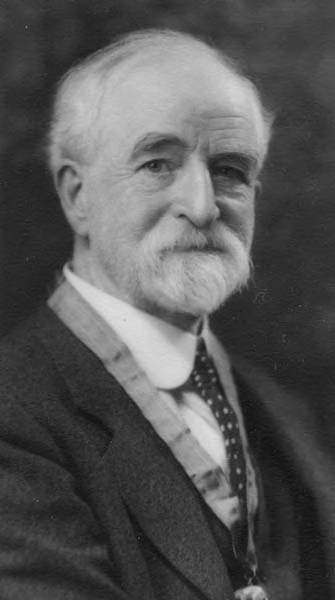
- Edmond S. Meany, early 1920s

Member of the Washington House of Representatives from the 42nd district
- In office 1891–1895

Personal details
- Born: Edmond Stephen Meany; December 28, 1862 East Saginaw, Michigan
- Died: April 22, 1935 (aged 72) University of Washington, Seattle, Washington
- Occupation: professor

Edmond Stephen Meany (December 28, 1862 – April 22, 1935) was a professor of botany and history at the University of Washington (UW). He was an alumnus of the university, having graduated as the valedictorian of his class in 1885 when it was the Territorial University of Washington. Meany also earned a Master of Science from the University of Washington in 1889, and a Master of Letters from the University of Wisconsin in 1901.

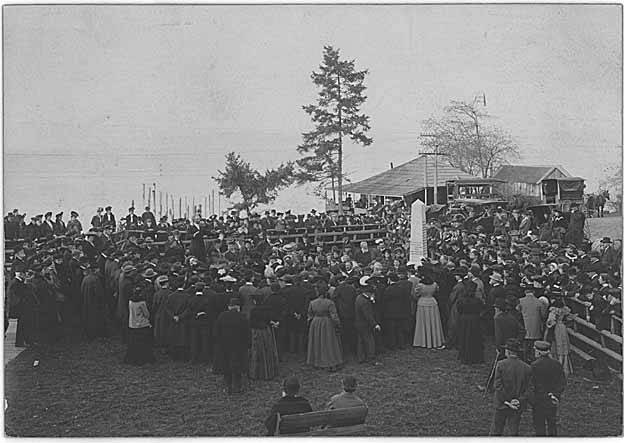
Meany orating the dedication of the Alki Point Monument November 13, 1905

He was elected as a Washington state legislator for the 1891 and 1893 sessions. Meany was an active supporter of the local Boy Scouts of America organization, the Seattle Area Council. From 1906 until his death, he served as managing editor of the Washington Historical Quarterly (renamed the Pacific Northwest Quarterly the year after his death). From 1908 until his death, he also served as president of the Mountaineers, a hiking and climbing club. In 1928 he purchased land in Martin, Washington and donated it to the Mountaineers. The ski lodge built there was named Meany Ski Hut in his honor.

== Honors ==
- In 1926 he was awarded an honorary Doctor of Laws from the College of Puget Sound.
- Mount Meany in the Olympic Mountains, Meany Crest on Mount Rainier, Meany Hall for the Performing Arts on the Seattle campus of the University of Washington, Camp Meany (a Cub Scout camp on the Olympic Peninsula from 1939 to 1942 and now a part of Camp Parsons), and Meany Middle School in Seattle, Washington are all named in his honor.
- The Mountaineers erected the Meany Memorial, a rock seat on Second Burroughs Mountain in Mount Rainier National Park a year after he died.

== Writings ==
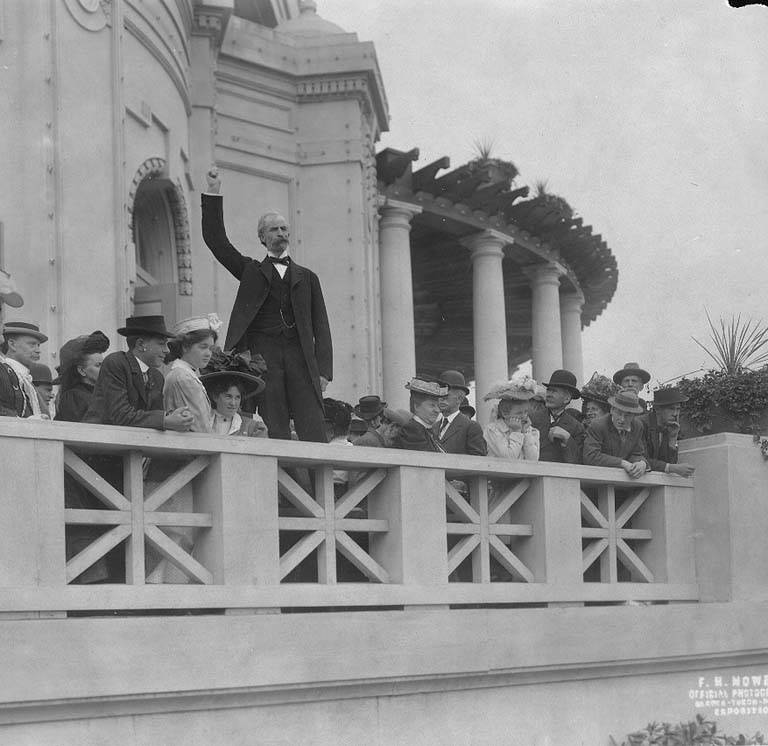
Meany addressing the president and stockholders of the Alaska–Yukon–Pacific Exposition in September 1908, the year before the exposition.

- Meany, Edmond S. (1915). Governors of Washington: Territorial and State (DJVU). Washington State Library's Classics in Washington History collection. University of Washington. OCLC 13072753.
- Meany, Edmond S. (1909). History of the State of Washington. New York: MacMillan. OL 23304976M.
- Meany, Edmond S. (1916). Mount Rainier: A Record of Exploration (DJVU). Washington State Library's Classics in Washington History collection. Binfords & Mort. OCLC 53070244.
- Meany, Edmond S. (1909). History of the University of Washington. Seattle: University of Washington Press.
- Newspapers of Washington Territory in Washington Historical Quarterly

== Archives ==
- Edmond S. Meany papers. 1877–1935. 71.86 cubic feet. At the University of Washington Libraries Special Collections.
- Clarence Bagley papers. 1864–1931. Approximately 10.33 cubic feet. At the University of Washington Libraries Special Collections.
