= Mountaineering: The Freedom of the Hills =

Mountaineering textbook

- 8th edition cover
- Language: English
- Genre: Non-fiction
- Publisher: The Mountaineers of Seattle
- Publication date: 1960

Mountaineering: The Freedom of the Hills is often considered the standard textbook for mountaineering and climbing in North America. The book was first published in 1960 by The Mountaineers of Seattle, Washington. The book was written by a team of over 40 experts in the field.

== Development ==
The book grew out of the annual climbing course run since 1935 by the Mountaineers, for which the reading material was originally a combination of European works and lecturers' mimeo outlines. These were assembled into the Climber's Notebook and published by the Mountaineers as the hardbound Mountaineers Handbook in 1948. By 1955 the rapid postwar evolution of climbing techniques and tools had made the Handbook out of date, and the effort was begun to produce Freedom of the Hills. Nearly 80 major contributors are credited in the first edition and it was organized by a committee of 8 editors. The first four editions were only available in hardcover.

The title of the book is a reference to the ancient medieval European tradition of "Freedom of the City", that conferred upon the recipient access to a city. The reference implies that with the knowledge in the book, a certain equivalent freedom of the wild mountains can be attained.

== Editions ==
Edition	Year	Editor(s)	Size	ISBN
1st	1960	Harvey Manning	430 pp.	
2nd	1967	Harvey Manning	485 pp.	
3rd	1974	Peggy Ferber	478 pp.	
4th	1982	Ed Peters	550 pp.	
5th	1992	Don Graydon	447 pp.	ISBN 0-89886-201-9 or ISBN 0-89886-309-0
6th	1997	Don Graydon and Kurt Hanson	528 pp.	ISBN 0-89886-427-5
7th	2003	Steven M. Cox and Kris Fulsaas	575 pp.	ISBN 0-89886-827-0
8th	2010	Ronald C. Eng	592 pp.	ISBN 978-1-59485-137-7
9th	2017	Eric Linxweiler and Mike Maude	624 pp.	ISBN 978-1-68051-004-1
10th	2024	Eric Linxweiler	621 pp.	ISBN 978-1-68051-606-7

== Structure and layout ==
=== Sections ===
In the 10th edition, the book is divided into six parts as follows:

- Part One: Outdoor Fundamentals
- Part Two: Climbing Fundamentals
- Part Three: Rock Climbing
- Part Four: Snow, Ice, and Alpine Climbing
- Part Five: Leadership, Safety, and Rescue
- Part Six: The Mountain Environment

There is an appendix, a glossary, and an index.

=== Chapters ===
1. First Steps
2. Clothing and Equipment
3. Camping, Food, and Water
4. Conditioning
5. Navigation and Communication
6. Wilderness Travel
7. Protecting The Outdoors
8. Essential Climbing Equipment
9. Basics of Climbing
10. Belaying
11. Rappelling
12. Sport Climbing and Technique
13. Rock Protection
14. Traditional Rock Protection
15. Aid and Big Wall Climbing
16. Basic Snow and Ice Climbing
17. Technical Snow and Ice Climbing
18. Waterfall Ice and Mixed Climbing
19. Glacier Travel and Crevasse Rescue
20. Avalanche Safety
21. Expedition Climbing
22. Leadership
23. Risk Management
24. First Aid
25. Self-Rescue
26. Mountain Geology
27. The Cycle of Snow
28. Mountain Weather

== See also ==
- Ten Essentials
- Alpine Club Guide
- Cascade Alpine Guide
