= Alaska Wilderness League =

US non-profit organization

- Formation: 1993
- Location: Washington, DC, United States

The Alaska Wilderness League (AWL) is a nonprofit organization that works to protect Alaska's most significant wild lands from oil and gas drilling and from other industrial threats. Founded in 1993, AWL has its main office in Washington, DC, with additional offices in Anchorage and Juneau, Alaska.

The AWL seeks to protect the Arctic National Wildlife Refuge from being opened to oil and gas development, and its leadership has made a significant impact in this area. The organization has rallied public support and successfully stopped numerous attempts by Congress to open the refuge to development. AWL's work had long-standing support from President Jimmy Carter, who served as its Honorary Chairman of the Board of Directors until his death in 2024.

In 2001, AWL and its supporters helped fund photographer Subhankar Banerjee's ground-breaking winter field photography in the Arctic National Wildlife Refuge. The photos he took were published in the book Seasons of Life and Land. Banerjee's photographs of the Refuge were exhibited at the Smithsonian Institution's National Museum of Natural History, and controversy erupted when his captions for the photos were altered and the exhibit was moved to a far corner of the museum. Some charged that Alaska Senator Ted Stevens had used political pressure to remove the exhibit from the spotlight because Senator Barbara Boxer had held up Banerjee's book during a Senate floor debate over oil drilling in the Refuge, but the museum maintained the changes were made "for artistic reasons". Starting in 2004, AWL expanded its work to include ecologically significant areas of Alaska's vast National Petroleum Reserve, the Tongass National Forest, and the outer continental shelf areas of the Beaufort and Chukchi Seas.
