= Martin Ski Dome =

- Interactive map of Martin Ski Dome
- Location: Martin, Washington
- Nearest city: Cle Elum, Washington
- Vertical: 300 ft (91 m)
- Base elevation: 3,000 ft (910 m)
- Skiable area: 137 acres (55 ha)
- Trails: ?
- Longest run: 3000'
- Lift system: Surface
- Terrain parks: none
- Snowmaking: No
- Night skiing: Yes

Martin, Washington
- Ghost town
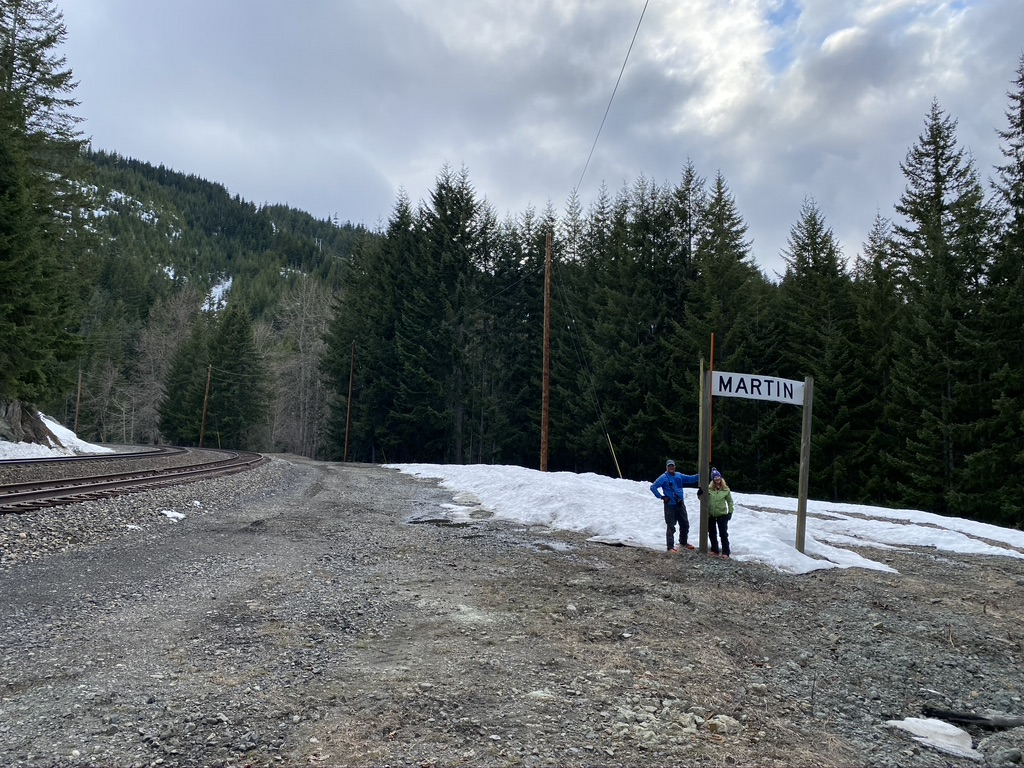
- Location sign for Martin, Washington

- Location within Washington (state) Location within the United States
- Coordinates: 47°16′50″N 121°19′04″W
- Country: United States
- State: Washington
- County: Kittitas
- Established: 1892
- Elevation: 2,815 ft (858 m)
- Time zone: UTC-8 (Pacific (PST))
  - Summer (DST): UTC-7 (PDT)
- GNIS feature ID: 1522758

The Martin Ski Dome was a ski area located in Martin, Washington.

Martin is an extinct town in the northwest United States, in Kittitas County, Washington. Stampede Pass is near to the west. The town was named Martin because of the nearby Martin Creek. The creek was originally named Pine-Marten Creek because an American marten was killed nearby.

== Amenities ==
A post office called Martin was established in 1892, and remained in operation until 1902.

A fire lookout was located in Martin from at least 1934–1956. The lookout tower does not appear on the 1961 USGS map.

== Sno-Park ==
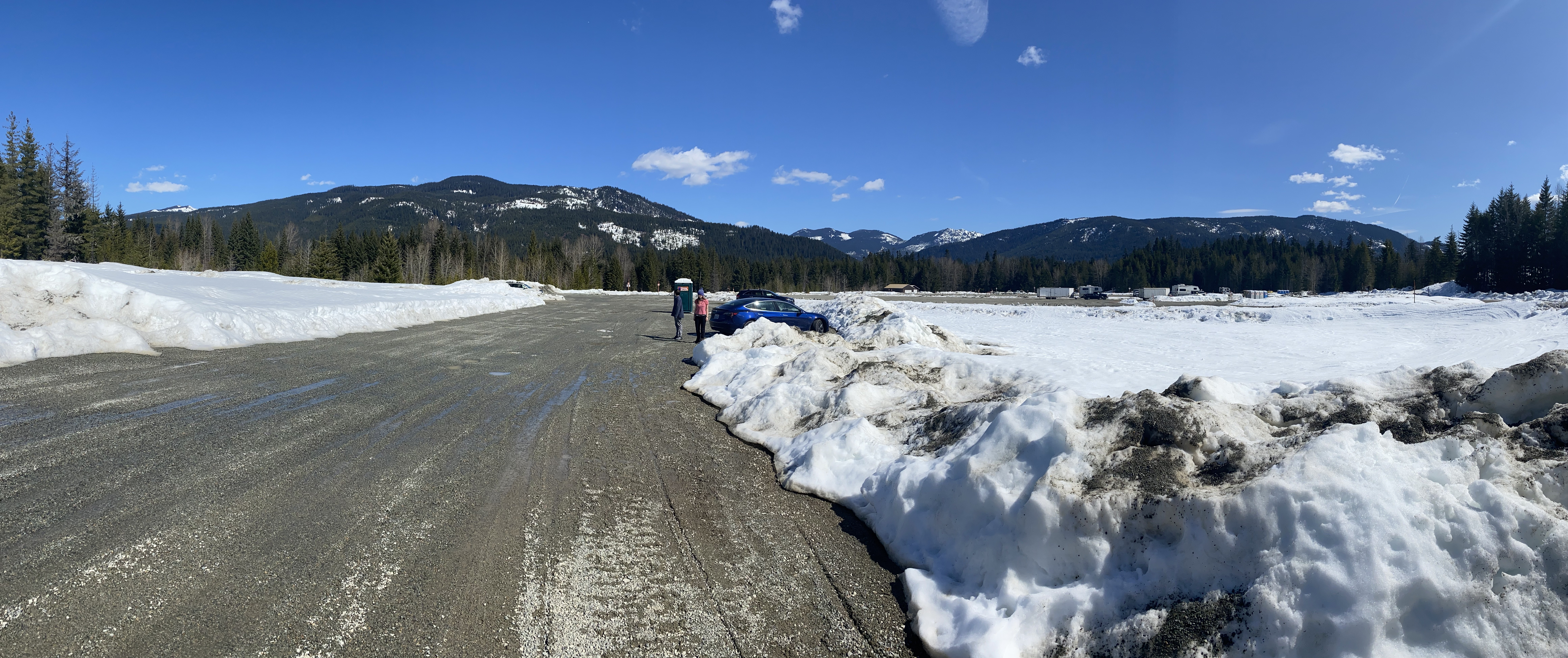
Overnight lot at Crystal Springs Sno-Park

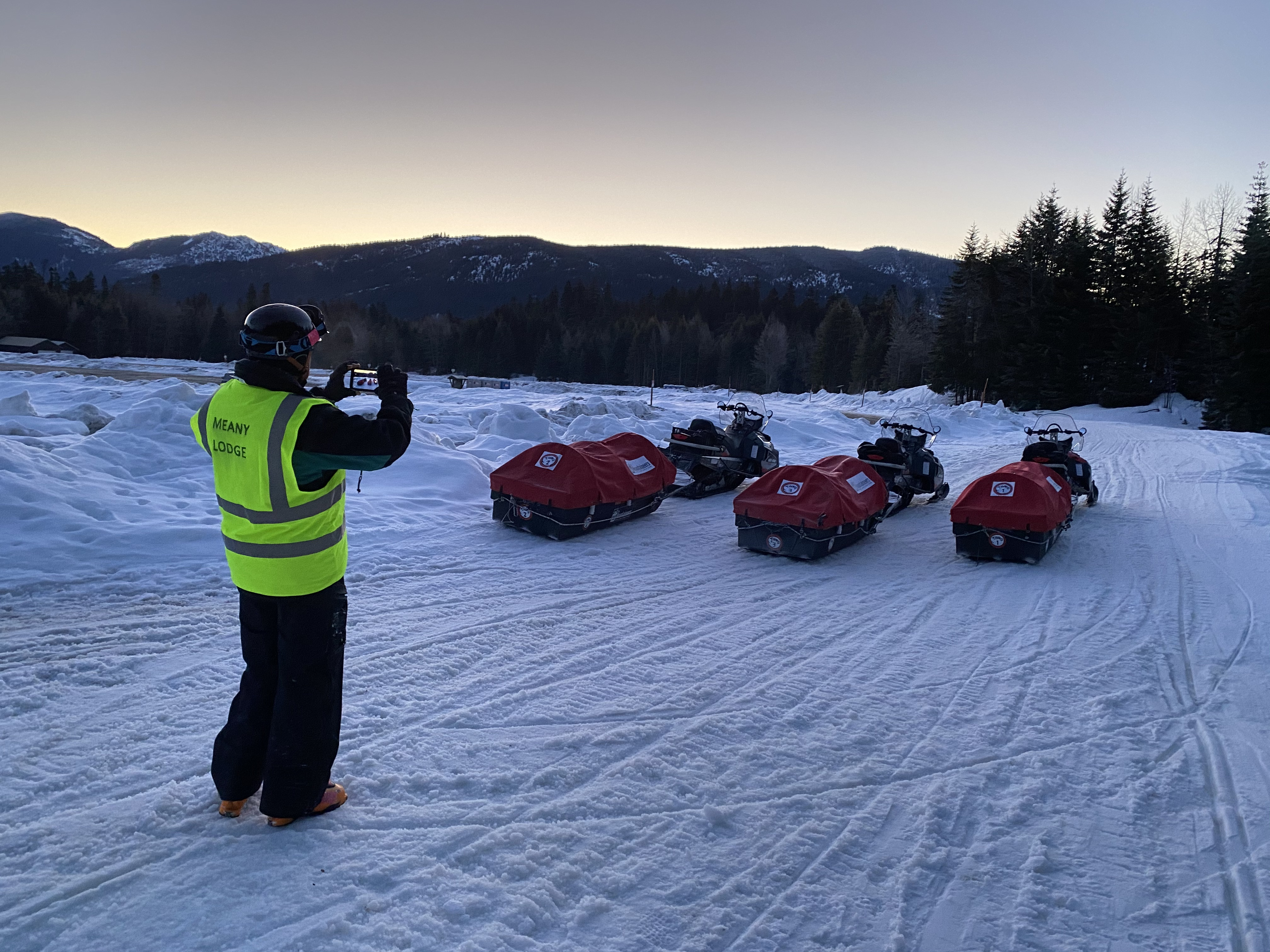
Snowmobiles in Crystal Springs Sno-Park

The Crystal Springs Sno-Park is located just off Exit 62 on I-90. Managed by the Lake Easton State Park, it provides access to the snow sports trails around and through Martin. The Sno-Park has plowed parking lots for non-motorized (skiers, sled dogs) users, motorized (snowmobiles & other tracked vehicles) users, and overnight guests to Meany Lodge & Trollhaugen.

== Erling Stordahl ==
The Erling Stordahl trailhead is just minutes away from the Crystal Springs Sno-Park. The flat easy trails are built and maintained in partnership by the Sons of Norway and the Ski for Light charity. They are specifically for the benefit of blind skiers but are open to all.

== Trollhaugen ==
A few more minutes up the dual groomed (x-country on the South, snowmobile on the North) Stampede Pass road is the Cascade Sons of Norway lodge Trollhaugen.

== John Wayne ==
Just over a half mile North of the Sno-Park, the Stampede Pass road crosses the Palouse to Cascades State Park Trail. Prior to 2018, the trail name was the John Wayne Pioneer Trail and was part of the Iron Horse State Park Trail. The trail is groomed in the winter and is well used by skiers. In the summer bikers, hikers, and horse riders use the trail.

== Sled Dogs ==
About a mile up Stampede Pass road the non-motorized (skiers, sled dogs) trail follows Forest Road 420 on the left and motorized (snowmobile) traffic stays right. These x-country ski trails are groomed by a grooming machine named Hippo owned by the Mountaineers and operated by their volunteers. This area is also where the Northwest Sled Dog Association holds their annual Crystal Dog Challenge on the groomed trails that pass through the area.

At the end of the 420 Road is the historic location of Martin and the Meany Lodge ski resort.

== Railroad history ==
=== Construction ===
Prior to the Stampede Tunnel, to reach the Puget Sound region from east of the Cascades, Northern Pacific Railroad (NP) trains had to pay for trackage rights on the Oregon Railway & Navigation Company (OR&N) tracks from Wallulla, Washington along the Columbia River to Portland. After that a car ferry across the Columbia returned trains to NP tracks north to Tacoma (1873) and eventually Seattle (1884). To avoid paying for trackage, NP decided a better path to the Puget Sound region was over the Cascades.

NP engineers spent from 1873 to 1884 narrowing down the candidate passes for crossing the Cascades to three: Snoqualmie, Stampede, and Natchess (Naches). The NP railroad had left Lake Superior and arrived in Yakima in 1885. At risk of losing millions of acres of land grants for failure to build a direct line to the Puget Sound, NP put out bids to drill the Stampede Tunnel in just 28 months. They opened the bids on Jan 21, 1886 and the lowest bidder was Nelson Bennett at $837,250, nearly half the price of most bidders. They awarded him the contract on Jan 29th. On February 1, the first wagonload of supplies left Yakima for the tunnel site. It took months to arrive as an army of men felled trees and built plank roads over which to haul the machines and supplies.

Once the caravan arrived, they set up their sawmill and used the lumber to build bunkhouses, stables, a machine shop, warehouses, a hospital, a restaurant, a saloon, a steam plant, and the station house. The construction camp was called Tunnel City and from 1886 to 1888 it housed over 200 construction workers who were building switchbacks and drilling the tunnel. Up the hill towards the Stampede Pass summit, 1,000 Chinese laborers who were also working on the tunnel were encamped.

In April 1886, under pressure from increasing OR&N through rates, NP decided to also build a temporary switchback over Stampede Pass. The route left the main line at the Martin station and rejoined the main line at the west end of the tunnel. The switchback was completed June 1, 1887. Passenger service began a month later on July 3 and Martin was station No. 1894. In the month of September, 1,900 cars were moved over the switchback line.

During the winter months heavy snow up to 10' deep would cover the line. In July 1887 snowsheds were constructed along the line including at Martin. The snow sheds were built of 10"x12" posts and 10"x16" caps and covered with 4" planks. In January 1888, a pair of Leslie rotary steam snow shovels arrived to keep the switchback line cleared.

On May 14, 1888, the tunnel bore was completed, just 7 days ahead of the contracts deadline. On May 28 the tunnel opened for traffic. The switchback route was used for a few tourist trains and then abandoned.

=== Decline ===
At the height of the steam era, NP employed operators around the clock at Martin. Martin was an important post in coordinating train movements through the single-track tunnel. Trains were authorized by the dispatcher and timetable. Over time, train engines switched to diesel and the number of men needed in Martin shrank. In 1921, Martin was at mile post 46.5 (0 was at Ellensburg) on the Seattle Main Line. In 1928, all that remained of Tunnel City was a station house labeled Martin and a few employee cottages.

In 1947, Martin was station No. 7023 at milepost 82.5 on the Tacoma Main Line.

In February 1949, Martin saw 3 ft (0.91 m) of snow fall the night of February 15. The snow depth increased from 13 ft (4.0 m) to 16 ft (4.9 m) overnight. The crew of 124 men (100 more than usual) tasked with keeping the line open with two rotaries and a plow could not remember a worse time.

In 1957 or 1958, NP installed a small CTC board at Easton to automate control traffic through the tunnel. In April 1960, Northern Pacific Railway removed trains No. 5 and No. 6, discontinuing passenger service to Martin. In 1963 they automated the Martin station and in the summer of 1964 they demolished all their buildings at Martin. The railroad subsequently abandoned their telephone lines and telephone cabins.

=== Abandonment ===
After NP merged into Burlington Northern (BN) in 1970, BN had several parallel routes across the Cascades. The Stampede route was relegated to a secondary. In 1977 a storm swelled Stampede Creek and it washed out the railroad tracks. Trains did not run again until 1978. On August 13, 1983, Burlington Northern discontinued use of the 78-mile line through the Stampede Tunnel, from Auburn to Cle Elum, but did not abandon the right of way. In July 1988, vandals stealing the copper from power transmission lines dropped a line near the eastern portal of the tunnel at Martin and set the wooden structure ablaze. The fire was put out by volunteers but the tunnel and hundreds of feet of track were destroyed.

=== Restoration ===
In 1995 Burlington Northern purchased Santa Fe and became BNSF. In 1996 they announced plans to spend $125 million to restore the Stampede Pass route. Soon 500 workers fanned out to install 145,000 concrete ties, 158,000 wood ties, and 47 new miles of rail. A new concrete snowshed was constructed at the Martin portal of the tunnel and in December rail service once again passed through Martin.

In 2019, BNSF added a signal tower at Martin that enables them to run double-length (230 cars) trains of empty grain cars eastward through the Stampede Tunnel. The longer trains have locomotives in the front, middle, and rear to prevent string-lining.

== Skiing in Martin ==
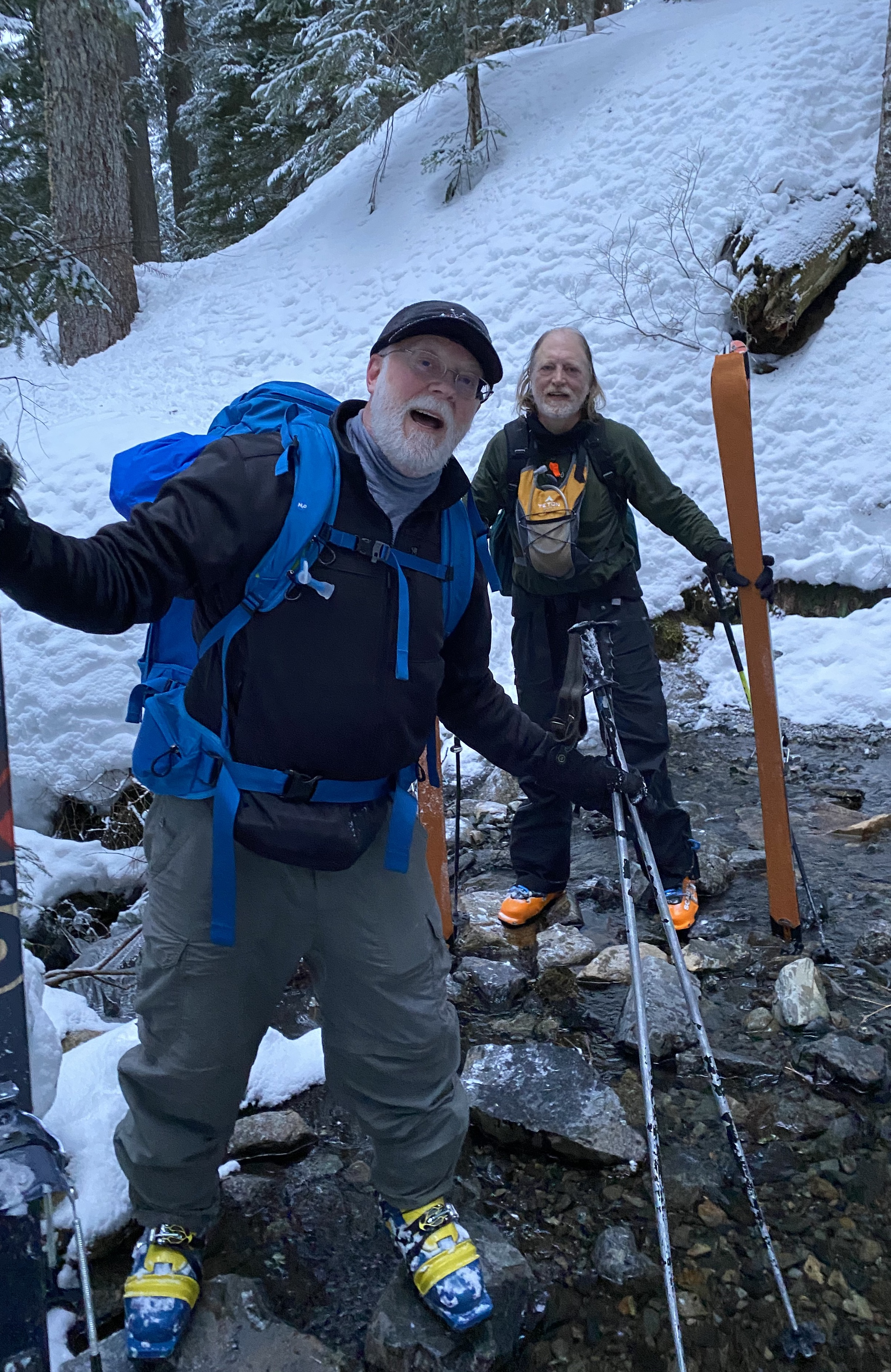
two skiers crossing a stream

Starting in the early 1920s, skiers from Cle Elum, Puget Sound and Seattle's King Street Station would ride the Northern Pacific Railroad to the Martin, Washington stop. The Seattle train left at 8AM, took about 3 hours to travel to Martin, waited 6 hours for the skiers and returned by 8PM. The railroad supplied "cozy warm shelter" in a dozen specially equipped bunk-cars and meal cars on a side track at the Martin station. Skiers could stay overnight and the railroad provided heating stoves and free coal.

=== Meany Lodge ===
In 1928, The Mountaineers built the Meany Ski Hut on 54 acres of Tunnel City, a 5-minute walk from the Martin rail stop. The hut was subsequently expanded and still operates as Meany Lodge.

== Ski bowl opens in 1938 ==
In 1938, to capitalize on the newly popular sport of skiing, the Northern Pacific Railroad opened the Martin Ski Dome. It was located just across the railroad tracks from the Meany Ski Hut.

In 1939 the railroad spent $8,235 to build a Lodge with accommodations for 30 overnight guests and a nearby caretaker's cabin on the eastern portal of the Stampede Tunnel. It was located just across the railroad tracks from the Meany Ski Hut and closed in 1942 with the start of World War II.

The lodge had 400 guests their first year who had to furnish their own bedding. There were two large living rooms with fireplaces, bunks in the women's and men's dormitories and a kitchen where skiers could cook their own meals.

Starting in 1939, the Camp Fire Girls held annual holiday ski trips at the Martin Ski Dome.

In 1942 the facility closed with the start of World War II. It was subsequently sold and operated as the Husky Chalet from 1944 thru the 1949 ski season.

== Husky Chalet ==
In 1944 the Associated Students of the University of Washington reinstituted its winter sports program. On February 7, 1945, they purchased the buildings from Northern Pacific for $1,250 and leased the land for $25/year.

Those certain buildings known as the Northern Pacific Ski Dome Lodge and the Caretakers Cabin, including the furnishing, equipment and supplies connected therewith; also water supply system, including intake and pipe line, all located upon the following tracts of land in Kittitas County, State of Washington, to wit:
Those parts of the S 1/2 NE 1/4, SE 1/4 NW 1/2, E 1/2 E 1/2 SE1/4, N 1/2 SE 1/4, and SW 1/4 SE 1/2, lying south of the 300 ft. right of way for the Bonneville Power Transmission Line and north of the 400 ft. right of way for the Northern Pacific Railway, in section 37, Township 21 North, Range 12 East, W. M., containing 137 acres, more or less.

The Husky Winter Sports Club reopened the site as the Husky Chalet with dorm lodging, 3 meals, ski lessons and rope tows for $2.25/day (1/3 the going rate).

In 1946 the HWSC membership topped 800 and they filled the lodge near capacity. To accommodate all the students, the HWSC also leased the nearby Rustic Inn located on the Sunset Highway (now I-90).

In 1947 the HWSC expanded the lodge (to sleep 120). Mattresses and pillows were now provided as well as showers and wash rooms. They also added floodlights for night skiing, a PA system for music, and gasoline drums to power the longer and now faster rope tows that ran at 750 feet a minute.

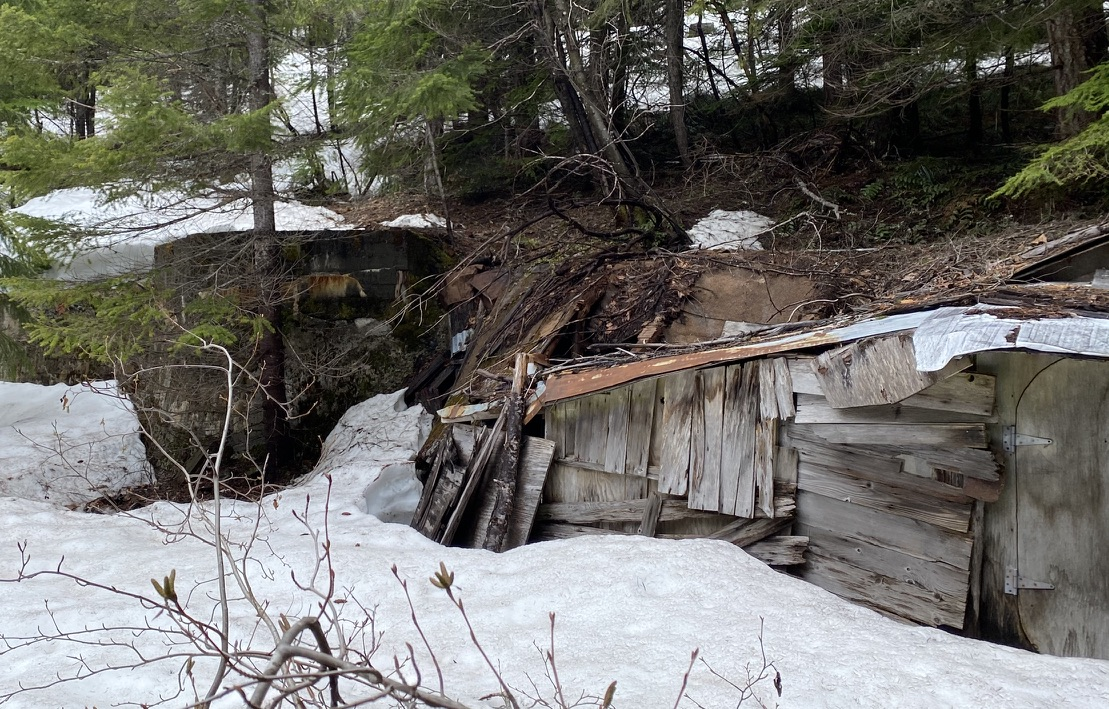
The foundation of the Martin Ski Dome

The UW ski team trained and held intercollegiate competitions at the site. Teams came from Utah, Eastern Washington College of Education, University of British Columbia, Montana State, Idaho, Washington State, Gonzaga and Washington.

In 1949, the Martin Ski Dome saw 3' of snow fall the night of February 15 for a total of 16' on the ground.

The Husky Chalet at Martin was the home base and center for HWSC's skiing until the lodge burned in the spring of 1949. Beginning in 1950, the club's activities took place on Stevens Pass. The lodge collapsed under deep snow in 1956.

== Access ==
=== Winter ===
Access in the winter is from the Crystal Springs Sno-Park. Forest Service road 54 is split groomed for tracked snow machines on the north side and non-motorized (skiers, sled dogs, etc.) on the south side.

=== Summer ===
Vehicle access to Martin is via exit 62 off I-90. Take FS 54 to FS 420. Follow FS 420 road to the end. The Palouse to Cascades State Park Trail crosses FS 54.

== See also ==
- Keechelus Lake
- Meany Lodge
- Palouse to Cascades State Park Trail
- Stampede Pass
