= The Mountaineers (club) =

Alpine club in Washington state, United States

- Formation: 1906; 120 years ago
- Type: Nonprofit organization
- Headquarters: Seattle, Washington, U.S.
- Website: www.mountaineers.org

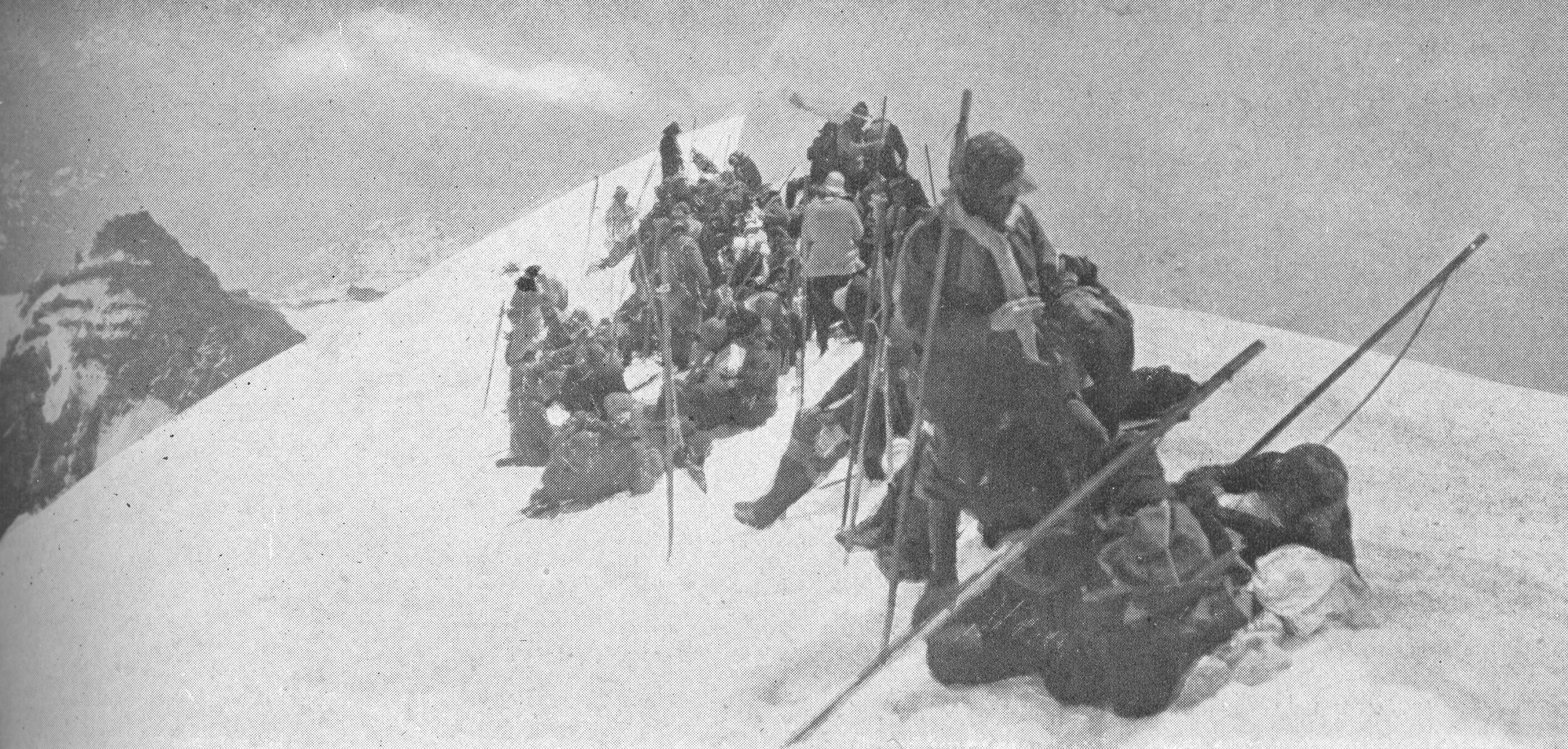
Members of The Mountaineers during the club's first climb of Mount Rainier in 1909.

The Mountaineers is an alpine club in the US state of Washington. Founded in 1906, it is organized as an outdoor recreation, education, and conservation 501(c)(3) nonprofit organization, and is based in Seattle, Washington. The club hosts a wide range of outdoor activities, primarily alpine mountain climbing and hikes. The club also hosts classes, training courses, and social events.

The club runs a publishing business, Mountaineers Books, which has several imprints. Publications include Mountaineering: The Freedom of the Hills.

== Organization and activities ==
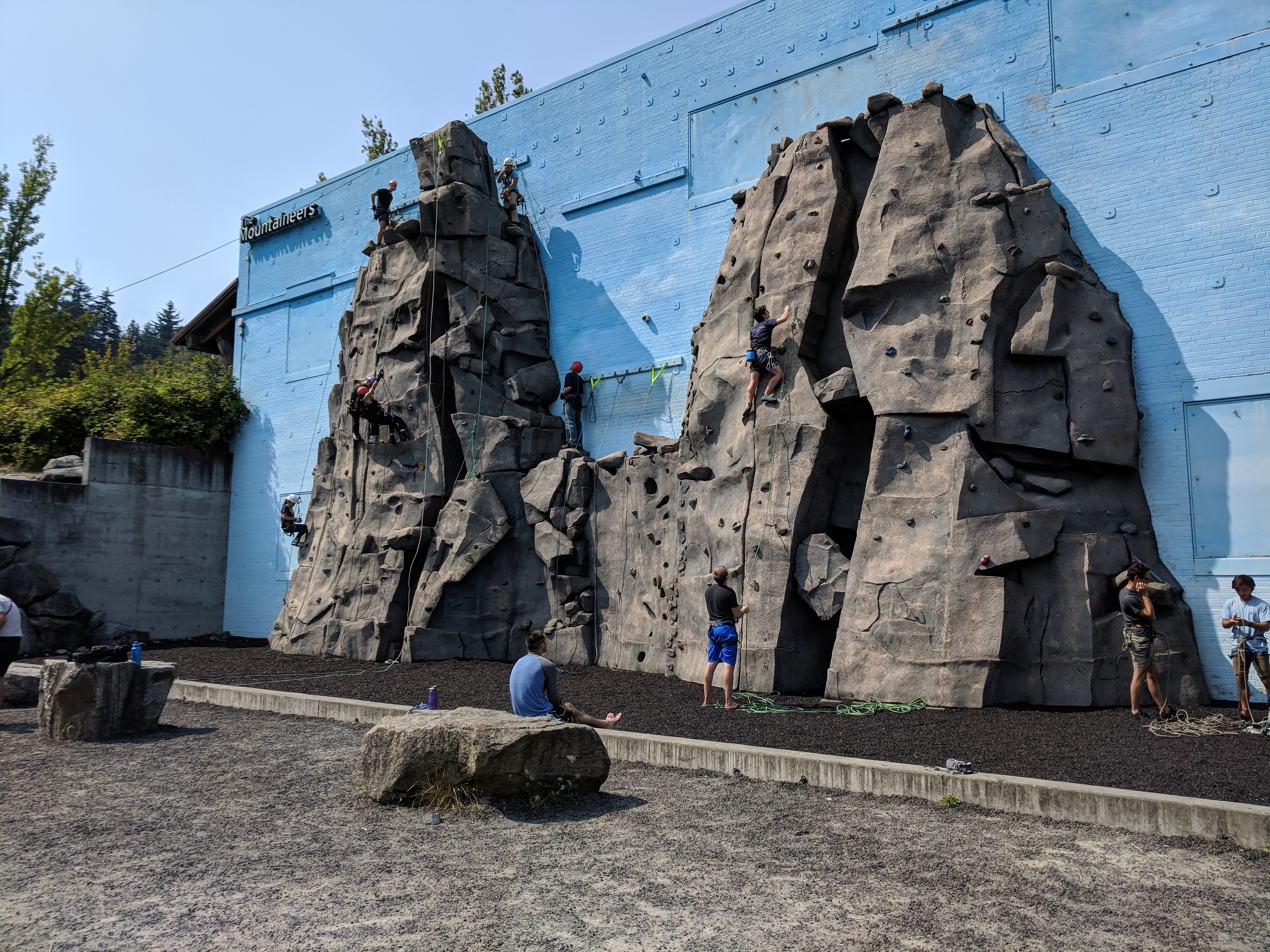
The climbing wall outdoors at The Mountaineers building at Magnuson Park.

The Mountaineers has 7 branches in Western Washington, 3 mountain lodges, and 2 program centers: one in Magnuson Park in Seattle, and one in Tacoma. All classes and trips are organized.

== History ==
Originally a Seattle-based part of the Mazamas, a Portland based group founded in 1894, The Mountaineers formed their own branch shortly after the 1906 Mazamas Mount Baker expedition and dubbed themselves "The Mountaineers" with 110 charter members. The club constitution was officially adopted in 1907 by a membership of 151. Among these original members were Henry Landes (University of Washington geology dean and later acting president), Edmond S. Meany (the father of the University of Washington Forestry school), the photographer Asahel Curtis, and Seattle photographer and North Cascades guide Lawrence Denny Lindsley.

The activities initially were local walks with the first trip being a hike through Fort Lawton to the West Point Lighthouse (now part of Discovery Park). The first mountain climbing trip was Mount Si. In 1907, 65 members made a group climb of Mount Olympus and exploration of the Olympic Mountains. The next year a summit of Mount Baker was organized, followed by Mount Rainier in 1909. In 1915, a club outing became the first sizable group to hike around Mount Rainier and established the route that would later become known as the Wonderland Trail.

From 1907 to 1995, new climbs in the Cascades were reported in the Mountaineers Annual. Since 2004, the Northwest Mountaineering Journal (NWMJ), hosted by the Mountaineers, has recorded this information.

=== 21st century ===
In the first 100 years since the club's founding it expanded to over 10,000 active members and expanded its offerings from a single annual alpine climb to a range of activities.. Classes are offered beyond climbing skills including nature photography, kayaking, snowshoeing,navigation and first aid. A thirty-hour wilderness first aid course called Mountaineering Oriented First Aid (MOFA) was produced by the organization. The organization is home to The Mountaineers Players which perform in the organization's Forest Theatre on the Kitsap Peninsula.

=== Magnuson Park facilities ===
In 2008, the Mountaineers moved from Lower Queen Anne to an old naval building in Magnuson Park, now leased from the City of Seattle.

== Lodges ==
The Mountaineers operates three lodges in the mountains of Washington State. They are primarily used as base-camps.

- Meany Lodge is ski area located near Stampede Pass with 3 rope tows and Nordic, down hill, and backcountry terrain.
- Baker Lodge is located adjacent to the Mt. Baker Ski Area
- Stevens Lodge is located adjacent to the Stevens Pass Ski Area

== Library ==
The Mountaineers Library was founded in 1915. As of 2011 it contained 6,000 books and subscribes to 40 periodicals. It specializes in studies on climbing, environmental studies, biographies of mountaineers, the history of exploratory mountaineering and natural history.

== Mountaineers Books ==
Mountaineers Books, based in Seattle, Washington, is the publishing division of The Mountaineers. It was informally started in 1955 when a volunteer committee was formed to create a mountaineering training text from the materials that the club was using for its classes.

Mountaineers Books has produced more than 1,000 titles since its foundation in 1960. Its first book was Mountaineering: The Freedom of the Hills, which has been updated several times since it was originally compiled in 1948. By 2024, the publisher had 22 employees. It also publishes conservation advocacy titles under the Braided River imprint.

=== Books published by Mountaineers Books ===
Award-winning and notable titles include:

- Mountaineering: The Freedom of the Hills (2024, 10th edition)
- Everest: The West Ridge, Anniversary Edition by Tom Hornbein Foreword by Jon Krakauer (2023 Anniversary edition, 1973)
- Freedom Climbers: The Golden Age of Polish Climbing by Bernadette McDonald (2013)
- Being Caribou by Karsten Heuer (2007)
- Arctic National Wildlife Refuge: Seasons of Life and Land Photos by Subhankar Banerjee Foreword by Jimmy Carter (2003)
- Men Against the Clouds (1980, revised edition)
