= Meany Lodge =

Ski area in Washington, United States

- Location in Washington Meany Lodge (the United States)
- Location: near Stampede Pass, Washington, US
- Nearest city: Cle Elum, Washington
- Coordinates: 47°16′49″N 121°19′14″W
- Vertical: 440'
- Top elevation: 3,200 ft (980 m)
- Base elevation: 2,800 ft (850 m)
- Skiable area: 54 acres (22 ha)
- Trails: 32 (4 groomed)
- Longest run: 1000'
- Lift system: 3 surface lifts
- Snowfall: NWS weather report
- Snowmaking: No
- Night skiing: Yes
- Website: http://www.meanylodge.org

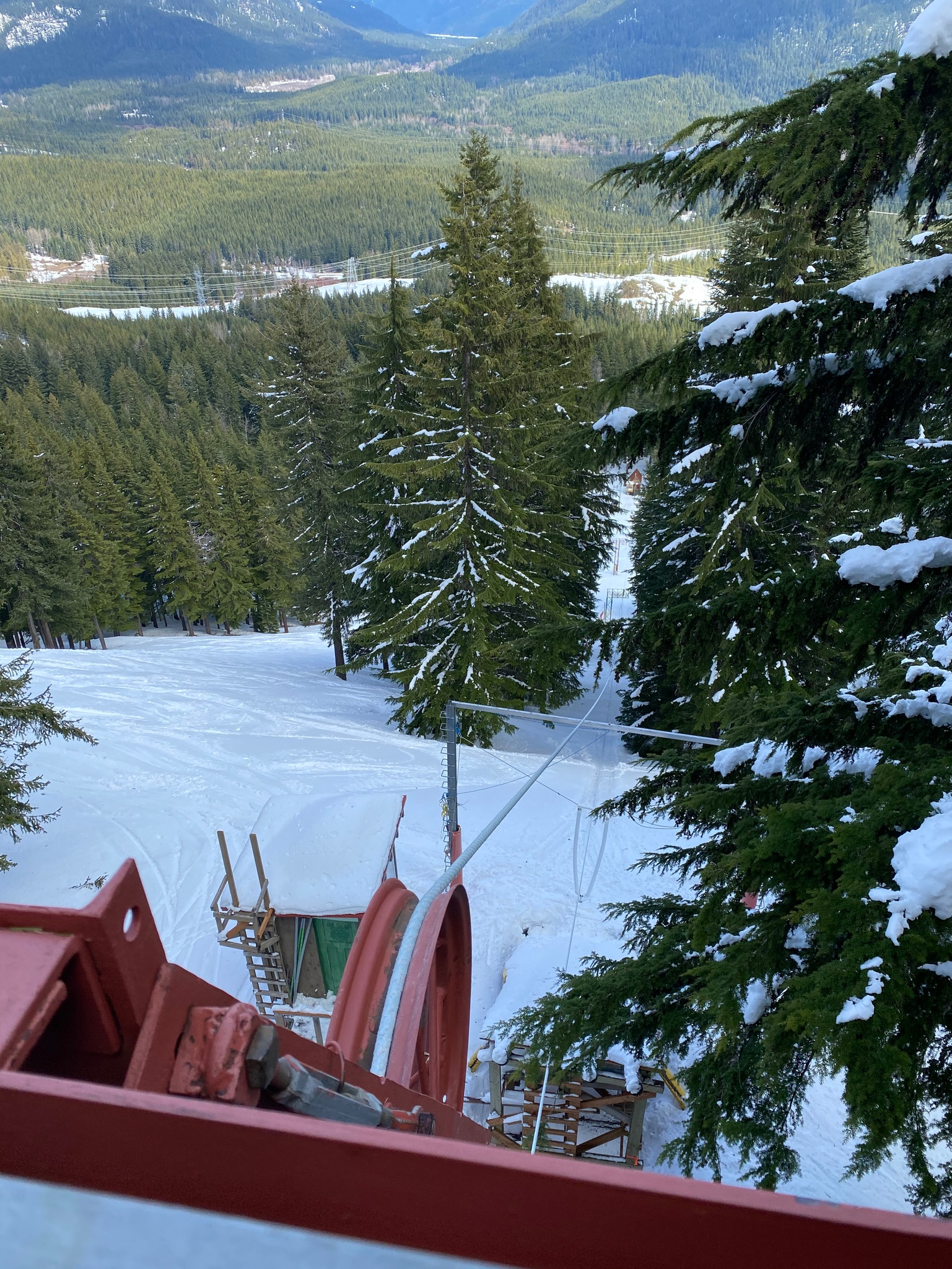
View from the top of the Lane

Meany Lodge is a 54-acre (22 ha) ski area located in Martin, Washington near Stampede Pass, Washington, United States. It was built in 1928, making it the oldest ski area in Washington and among the oldest in the U.S.

Meany Lodge is maintained and operated by volunteers of The Mountaineers, a non-profit group, and is located in the Wenatchee National Forest near the eastern portal of the Stampede Pass Train Tunnel.

Meany Lodge has a PSIA certificated ski school and offers lessons to alpine skiers, cross country skiers, touring skiers, snowshoers, and snowboarders. Lessons are available when booking reservations.

Reservations are needed for day and overnight use. Overnight reservations include a bunk and all meals. The lodge capacity is 97 persons.

== Snow Sports ==
=== Alpine Skiing ===
Alpine (downhill) skiers and snowboarders have access to 32 downhill runs of which 4 are groomed. Access to the runs are via 3 rope tows. The longest tow Mach is the longest certified rope tow west of the Rockies. The slope has a 450-foot (140 m) vertical drop.

=== Cross-country skiing ===
There is approximately one mile of groomed cross-country trails around the lodge with additional groomed trails winding through the surrounding landscape. Historic Stampede Pass, the NWS Weather Station at Stampede Pass, and the Palouse to Cascades State Park Trail are near the lodge.

=== Ski Touring ===
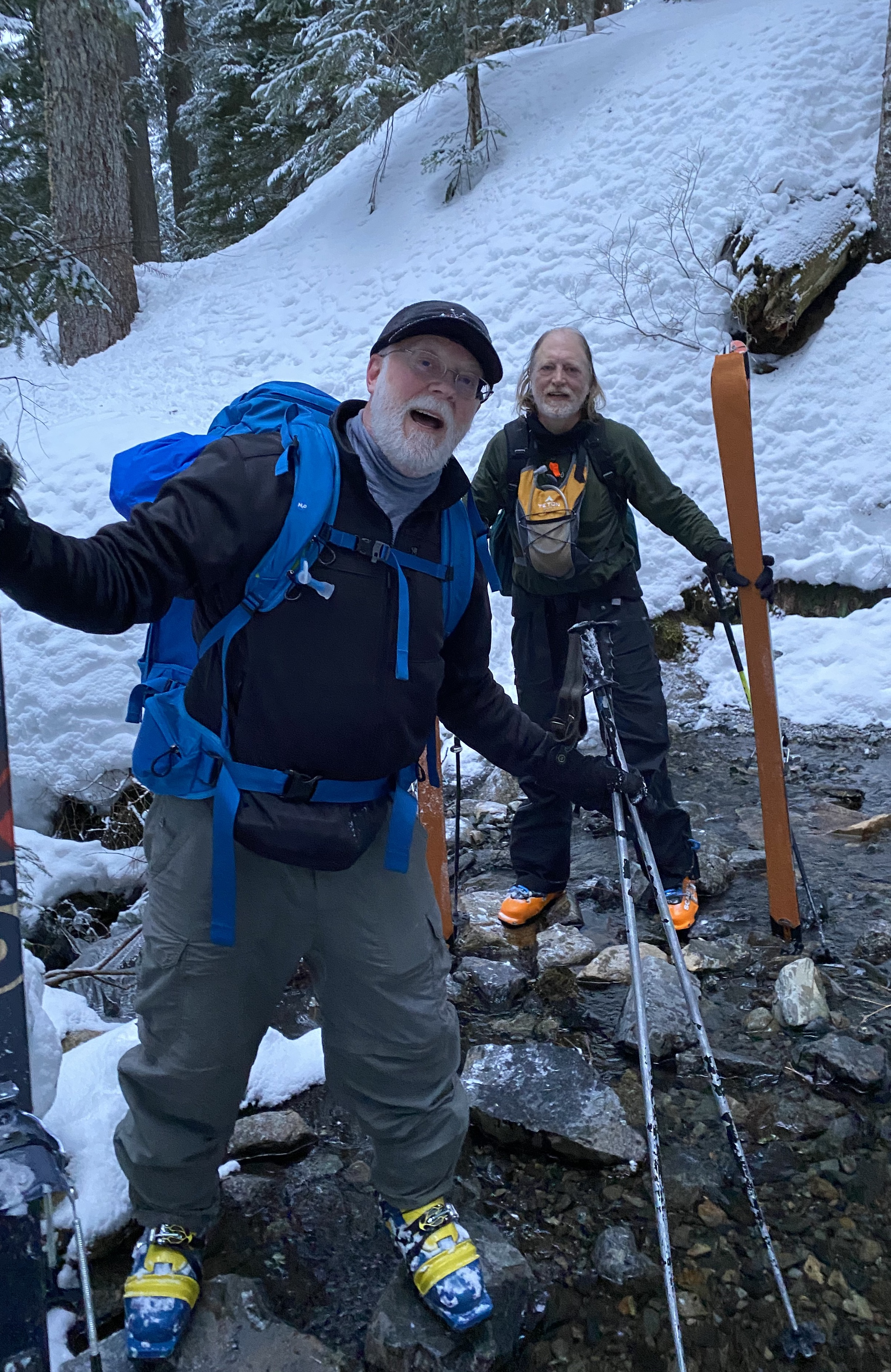
backcountry skiers crossing a stream

Much like the first skiers to visit the Martin area, ski touring is still practiced. Today's skiers use Randonee, Telemark, and Alpine Touring bindings. Touring gear at Meany is especially common in the weeks before the annual Patrol Race.

== Ski Runs ==
=== Lane ===
In 1931 the Lane was constructed by logging the trees off Meany Hill. The logs were used to construct a log cabin tow hut.

=== Lower Slobbovia (aka South) ===
In 1954 the Bonneville Power Administration constructed a power line over the south end of Meany property. The cleared area provides excellent skiing. The 1957 relocation of Mach was to gain better access to this slope.

=== North Slobbovia (aka North) ===
In 1963, Puget Sound Power & Light, thinking they were on the BPA right-of-way, ran a transmission line up the center of North Slobbovia. In consideration for an easement and Meany volunteers not removing their power line, Puget Sound Power agreed to bury the line and saw the stumps they left flush with the ground. North is accessed by releasing from Mach anywhere above the 3/4 pole.

=== Henrietta's Meadow ===
In 1978 the Forest Service logged off Section 34. This ski run was formerly known as Henrietta's Woods.

== Rope Tows ==
=== Mach ===
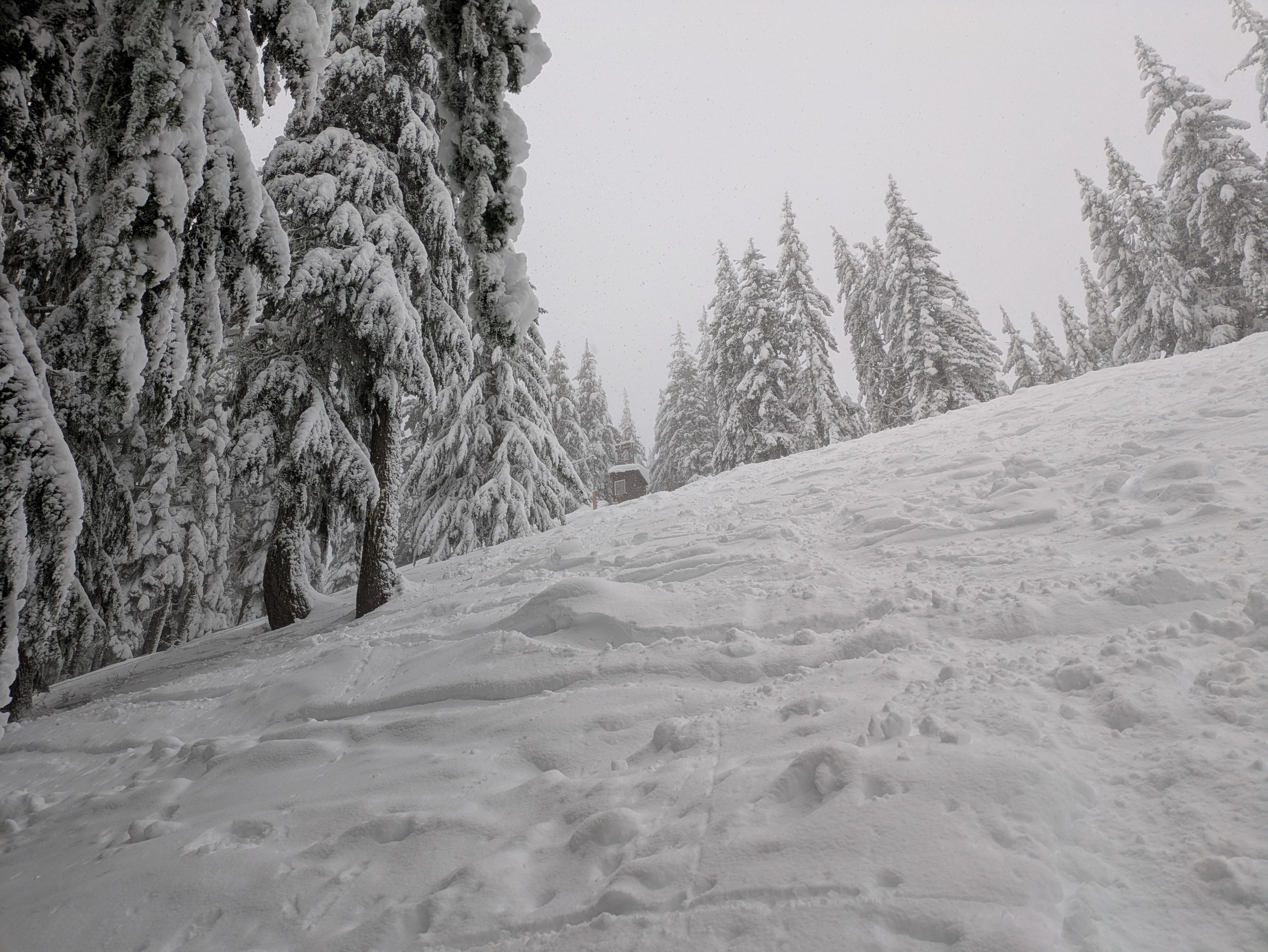
Top of the Mach tow

In 1938 Mach was constructed by Jack Hossack. A Fordson tractor pulled skiers 70% of the way up the Lane gaining 280-foot (85 m) over a 835-foot (255 m) run. The first rope tows constructed in the Northwest were Snoqualmie (January 1, 1938), Mt. Rainier, and Mt. Baker.

In 1943, the head pole was moved to the top of the Lane, increasing the vertical gain to 340-foot (100 m).

In 1945, the head pole was moved again increasing the vertical gain to 380-foot (120 m).

In 1946, Mach powertrain was replaced with a Chevy engine and transmission and a truck rear end. The result was faster and more powerful, so more skiers could be towed.

In 1957, the base of the Mach tow was moved lower and the head pole moved higher, increasing the length to 1,000-foot (300 m) and 440-foot (130 m) of vertical.

In 1986 the control tower was added.

In 2013, Mach moved the rope at 15 miles per hour (24 km/h); before lift speeds were regulated, it ran at 21 miles per hour (34 km/h).

In 2014, the gas engine powering Mach was replaced with an electric motor.

=== Super Worm ===
In 1973 the Worm rope tow was added. It goes halfway up the Lane (450-foot (140 m) long, 160-foot (49 m) high) for beginners.

In 1987, with parts donated by Crystal Mountain, the tow was upgraded to 510-foot (160 m) long, a faster 20 HP motor that could tow more people. The upgraded tow was christened the Super Worm.

=== Turtle ===
Installed in 1987, with parts from Worm and donations from Crystal Mountain. It has a 7.5 HP motor and goes very slow for beginners.

== History ==
In 1915 skiing begin in the PNW when a few Mountaineers started wearing skis to the Snoqualmie Lodge and Paradise instead of snowshoes. For the next two decades, skiing meant ski touring and the epicenter in the Northwest was at the Snoqualmie Lodge. By the early 1920s, skiing was gaining a following.

In 1927, the Mountaineers wanted to add a ski hut near Stampede Pass. The scouting committee led by Ernest N. Harris rode the Northern Pacific Railroad to Martin and stayed in railroad shacks/cottages near the Stampede Pass tunnel. The train fare to Martin was as low as $1.80 per round trip.

In the summer of 1928, Edmond S. Meany purchased the 54-acre plot for $125 and donated it to the Mountaineers. That fall a cabin was constructed. On Armistice Day 1928, it was dedicated as the Meany Ski Hut.

In 1938 the rope tow Mach was constructed. This transformed Meany from "touring only" to mostly downhill skiing and doubled the patronage of Meany. That same year, the Northern Pacific Railroad built the Martin Ski Dome across the railroad tracks from the Meany Ski Hut.

In 1956, Meany saw its deepest snow yet with 15 feet (4.6 m) at the lodge. The heavy snows crushed the Husky Chalet.

=== Ski Competitions ===
In 1929 Meany began ski instruction and on March 10, 1929, held its first annual cross country race. Ellen E. Willis won the women's Meany Ski Hut Trophy and Hans Otto-Giese won the men's.

In 1930, club slalom and downhill races were held. In addition, the first annual Patrol Race was held. The Ski Patrol Race was opened to other ski clubs in 1936. In 1941, the last Ski Patrol Race was held the world entered World War II. The annual competition was resurrected in 2014.

=== Lodge History ===
In the fall of 1927, a crew of 100 Mountaineers hauled supplies by hand uphill 300 yards from the Martin station. In two months of weekends, the original 20-foot (6.1 m) x 50-foot (15 m)' two-story wood cabin large enough for 50 people was constructed. Tables and benches were also built and a 1,700 pound kitchen range was hauled up with block and tackle.

In 1939, a 25' x 30' three-story addition and basement was added. The lodge then had 4 stories: the basement, main floor, and two attic dorm floors.

In 1953 the coal-fired kitchen range upon which 25 years of cooks have suffered was replaced with a propane range.

In 1970 the basement was expanded with a drying room and another dorm was built.

=== Transportation ===
The Sunset Highway wasn't regularly open during the winter so the Northern Pacific Railroad was the primary means of access to Meany lodge. By the late 1930s, Snoqualmie Pass was plowed open more regularly and some skiers would park at the Rustic Inn on the Sunset Highway (present day I-90) and ski the 3 miles to the lodge.

In April 1960, NPRR removed its trains No. 5 and No. 6, discontinuing passenger service to Martin. Meany leased a Bombardier snow tractor, later christened Tomcat, to haul gear and tow skiers the 3 miles from I-90 to Edifus Wreck, a drop off point just below railroad curve.

In 1966, the trail above the railroad tracks was widened to permit vehicle access.

In 1983, BNSF Railway discontinued the 78-mile line through the Stampede Tunnel but did not abandon the right of way. On December 5, 1996, they resumed regular train service across Stampede Pass.

Today, winter access to Meany Lodge is via tracked snow machines (Tomcat and/or snowmobiles) on a scheduled basis or ad hoc via snowshoes or skis.

=== Electricity ===
In 1963, a 2.4KV electric line was built from the Martin station. An additional 600' feet of 2.4KV line was installed to connect between the buildings.

In 1980 falling trees knocked out power. After restoration, Burlington Northern Railroad advised that their power line (which the lodge used) would be abandoned. In 1981, a new 500' power line was constructed to connect to Puget Sound Energy. Transformers convert the 7200V supply to 240V.
