= Northwest Mountaineering Journal =

The Northwest Mountaineering Journal was a now defunct online magazine started in 2004 by Lowell Skoog to serve as a record of new climbs and ski descents, as well as to provide articles and stories pertinent to mountaineering in the Pacific Northwest of North America. The magazine was run by volunteers and hosted on the server of the Mountaineers and CascadeClimbers.com. It was published annually. Following the publication of the 2010 volume, Lowell Skoog stepped down as editor, and the magazine effectively ceased to exist. In 2014 the Mountaineers quit hosting the archives.

Historically, new routes were reported in the Mountaineers Annual through 1985. The American Alpine Journal documents routes around the world, including from Washington, but requires that routes be of at least a minimum seriousness (grade IV). Online interaction through forums such as CascadeClimbers.com, aerial photography by John Scurlock, and a critical mass of active climbers has helped spur a renaissance of route development and exploration, many of which are less than a grade IV, but there was not a venue for documenting these routes for posterity.
