= Subhankar Banerjee (photographer) =

American photographer

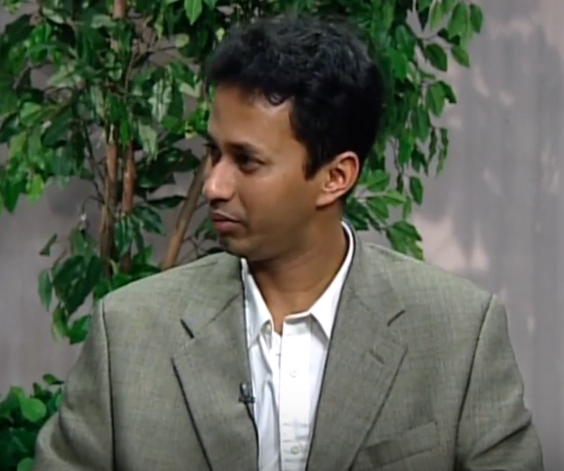
Subhankar Banerjee

Subhankar Banerjee (born 1967) is a photographic artist, educator and activist whose images of the Arctic National Wildlife Refuge and other Alaskan wild lands have captured international attention.

== Early life ==
Born in Berhampore, India, Banerjee received his bachelor's degree in engineering before moving to the United States, where he received master's degrees in physics and computer science. He worked in scientific fields for six years at the Los Alamos National Laboratory in New Mexico and Boeing in Seattle. In 2000, his childhood passion for art, coupled with a deep love and concern for the wilderness and disappearing indigenous cultures, caused him to leave his career in science to pursue art. Since then he has focused all his efforts on indigenous human rights and land conservation issues in the Arctic.

== Career ==
In 2001 Banerjee began the first of two years of ground-breaking year-around field photography in the Arctic National Wildlife Refuge. The photos he took were published in the book Seasons of Life and Land. Banerjee's photographs of the Refuge were exhibited at the Smithsonian Institution's National Museum of Natural History, and controversy erupted when his captions for the photos were altered and the exhibit was moved to a far corner of the museum. Senator Richard J. Durbin and others in Congress felt that the Smithsonian had been pressured, probably by Alaska Senator Ted Stevens, to remove the exhibit from the spotlight because Senator Barbara Boxer had held up Banerjee's book during a Senate floor debate over oil drilling in the Refuge. The museum maintained the changes were made "for artistic reasons". The attention brought by the controversy led the exhibit to travel to sixteen museums around the United States and since then Banerjee's work has been exhibited in more than fifty museums around the world.

Banerjee's book, Arctic Voices: Resistance at the Tipping Point (Seven Stories Press, Summer 2012), addresses current issues of climate change in the Arctic, resource war, and human rights using first-person narratives from activists, writers, and researchers. The volume is used for teaching environmental humanities and has formed the basis for other projects, such as a 2018 series of haiku poems.

== Awards ==
Banerjee has received many awards for his Arctic work including an inaugural Greenleaf Artist Award from the United Nations Environment Programme and an inaugural Cultural Freedom Fellowship from the Lannan Foundation. Banerjee was an artist-in-residence at Dartmouth College and the Sea Change Artist-Activist Resident at the Gaea Foundation in 2009.
